= Guillaume Casman =

Belgian soldier, explorer and administrator

Guillaume-Camille Casman
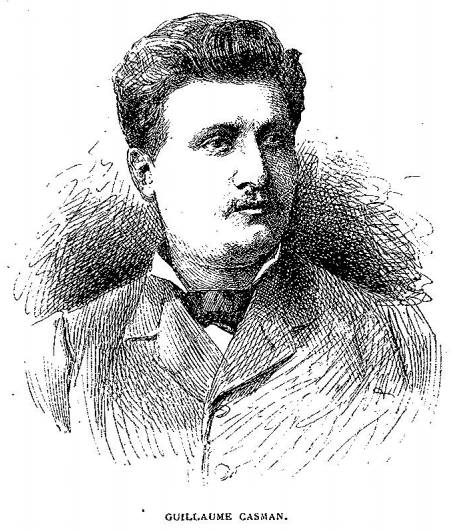

Head of Équateur Station
- In office December 1884 – 14 May 1885
- Preceded by: Alphonse van Gèle
- Succeeded by: Camille Van den Plas

Personal details
- Born: 23 November 1854 Brussels, Belgium
- Died: 14 May 1885 (aged 30) Êquateurville, Congo Free State
- Occupation: Soldier, explorer, administrator

Guillaume-Camille Casman (23 November 1854 – 14 May 1885) was a Belgian soldier, explorer and administrator for the International African Association and the Congo Free State. He was briefly commander of the Équateur station on the upper Congo.

== Early years ==
Guillaume-Camille Casman was born in Brussels on 23 November 1854. He worked at the Société Belge des Chemins de Fer du Grand Central and was a sergeant in the chasseurs-éclaireurs (scouts) battalion of the Brussels civic guard. He joined the service of the International Association of the Congo and left for the Congo in November 1883.

== Colonial career ==
Casman arrived in Vivi and joined an expedition led by Captain Edmond Hanssens. They left on 21 January 1884 with a column of 30 men, and reached the banks of the Bundi River on 23 January 1884. Rains had made it overflow its banks and turn its valley into a huge swamp. On 7 February 1884 they reached the north Manianga plateau, where Hanssens found a letter from Henry Morton Stanley directing him to come to Léopoldville and Casman to establish a station at Mukumbi, five days by land northwest of Manyanga, near the source of the Mata River, a right tributary of the Congo. The German officer Boshaert (Note: Coosemans, in the article on Casman in the Biographie Belge d'Outre-Mer, calls Casman's deputy "the Bavarian officer Boshaert". M. Boshaert is mentioned several times by Martrin-Donos in Les Belges dans l'Afrique Centrale (1886). This may be August Boshart, author of Zehn Jahre afrikanischen Lebens (1898), who travelled in the Congo region, in South West Africa in 1887, and in Zanzibar.) was to be Casman's deputy. They left Manyanga on 12 February 1884 with 42 Africans who had been trained by Lieutenant Louis Haneuse.

They traveled up the right bank of the Congo to Mpangu, then to the Mata River, Kinkumba, the capital of the Songo district, and finally to Mukumbi's huts which Casman reached on 19 February 1884. They smoothed their way with gifts to the local people. By 24 March 1884 two shelters had been erected for Casman's tent and merchandise. On 3 August 1884 he was visited by Lieutenant Willem Frans Van Kerckhoven who had been relieved of his command at Isangila and was concluding treaties with the tribes around Mukumbi. On 14 September 1884 Stanley called for Casman to command the Équateur station on the upper Congo.

Casman reached Léopoldville on 26 September, where he found Hanssens. On 11 November 1884 he left there for Équateur in an expedition with three steamers: the Royal, A.I.A. and En Avant. The members included Casman, Charles Liebrechts and Camille Van den Plas. They stopped at Kimpoko to embark Edde Gleerup, who had been appointed second to Arvid Wester at the Falls. On 24 November 1884 they reached Msuata, where Liebrechts stayed, and where they met Giacomo Savorgnan di Brazzà and Attilio Pécile, of the French mission, who were going by canoe to the Alima.

On 12 December 1884 Casman arrived at Equateur Station, where Alphonse van Gèle handed over command in a ceremony before the native chiefs. In December 1884 Casman concluded three treaties in the region on behalf of the International Association of the Congo (AIC). Casman came down with fever in May 1885 and died after a few days on 14 May 1885. He was succeeded in quick succession by Georges Pagels, Charles Liebrechts and then on 1 July 1885 by Camille Van den Plas.

== Sources ==
- 10 Jahre Afrikanischen Lebens, Boshart A., 1898 (in German), Hammelburger Antiquariat
- Coosemans, M. (21 May 1948), "CASMAN (Guillaume-Camille)" (PDF), Biographie Belge d'Outre-Mer (in French), vol. II, Académie Royale des Sciences d'Outre-Mer, pp. 143–147
- Martrin-Donos, Ch. de (1886), "XX" (PDF), Les Belges dans l'Afrique Centrale (in French)
- Omasombo Tshonda, Jean, ed. (2016), Équateur : Au cœur de la cuvette congolaise (PDF), Musée royal de l’Afrique centrale, ISBN 978-9-4922-4423-9
