= Swedish soldiers in the Congo Free State =

Swedish mercenaries in the Congo

- Kongofarare
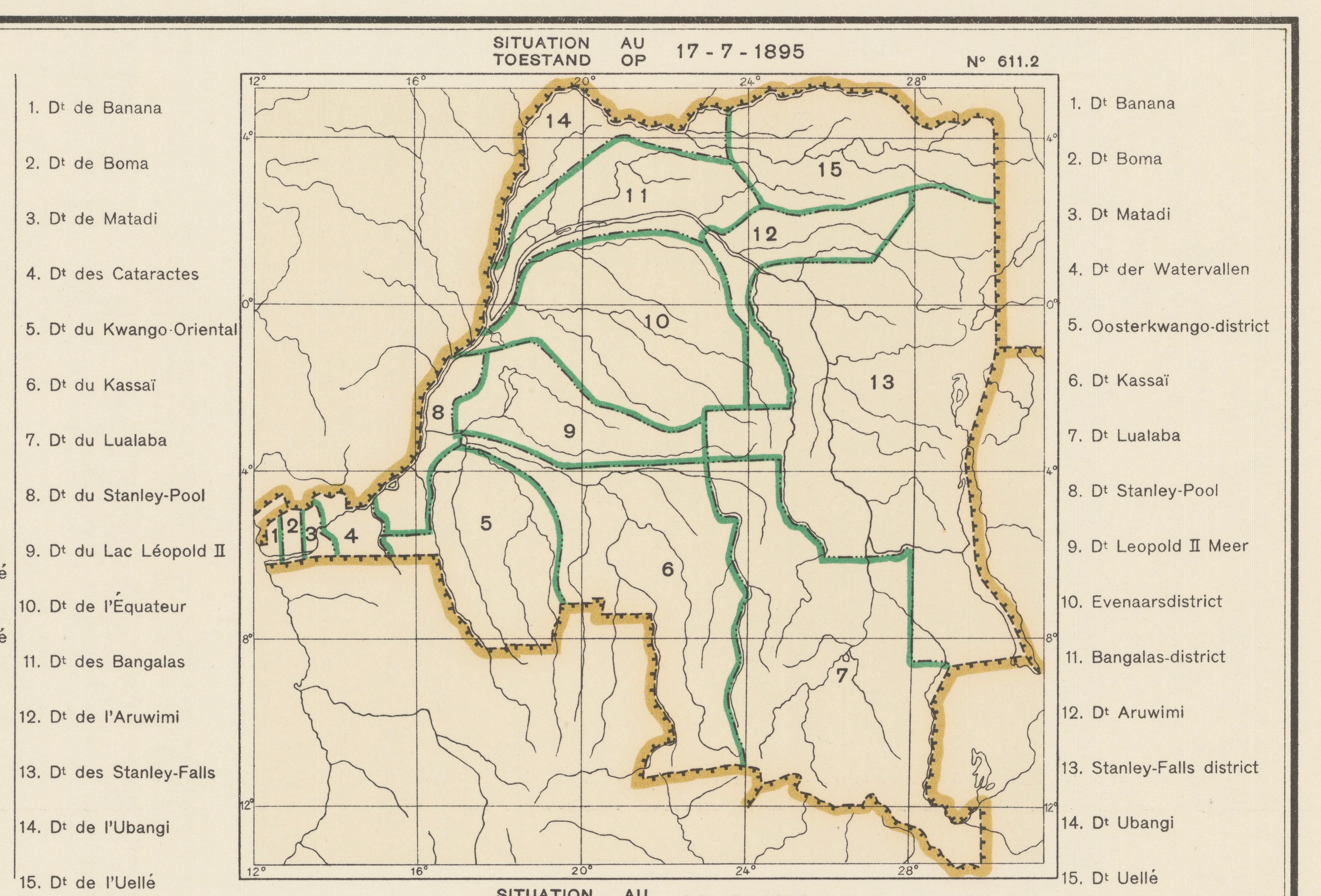
- Map of the administrative regions of the Congo Free State, 1895.
- Active: 1883–1910s
- Country: Sweden
- Allegiance: Sweden-Norway (1885–1905); Sweden (1905– ) Congo Free State
- Size: 522–600
- Engagements: See list: Colonization of the Congo; Batetela rebellion (1895-1908); Congo river expedition (1885); Feud with Tippu Tip

Between the years of 1885 and 1908, many Swedish soldiers would aid king Leopold II in his colonization of the Congo attracted by better pay and opportunities. The Swedes would be the third most numerous nationality in Leopold II's army and would often engage the Congolese natives in combat. However, with Leopold II's Congo being handed over to Belgium and the heightened military preparedness following the dissolution of the Swedish-Norwegian Union, most soldiers would return to Sweden.

== Background ==
Ivory and rubber were in high demand in Europe during the late eighteenth century mainly due to the invention of rubber tires, the Congo had an abundance of these resources making it a sought-after piece of Africa. After the Berlin Conference of 1884-1885, Leopold II of Belgium's territorial claims were legitimized by the other European powers, though, this was only on paper as the overwhelming majority of the Congo was still ruled by local tribes and kingdoms. Wanting to capitalize on the vast resources of the region, Leopold II would search for mercenaries that could assist him in colonizing the Congo. Leopold II was particularly impressed by the soldiers of Sweden and even reached out himself trying to recruit them to the Force Publique. Many Swedes were enthusiastic about Leopold II's offer as opportunities and pay were not very good in the Swedish army, the soldiers also regarded the chances of Sweden getting involved in a war in the near future as low making rising the ranks difficult. (See also: Swedish neutrality)

=== List of notable Swedes who would travel to the Congo ===
- Edde Gleerup, left Sweden in 1883 and became the head of the Kimpoko station.
- Peter August Möller, left Sweden in 1883 and was the head of the Matadi station.
- Georges-Guillaume Pagels, left Sweden on the second of March 1883 and would be stationed in Kimpoko.
- Arvid Wester, left Sweden on the fourteenth of November 1883, and he would be involved in defending the Stanley Falls station.

== Operations in the Congo ==
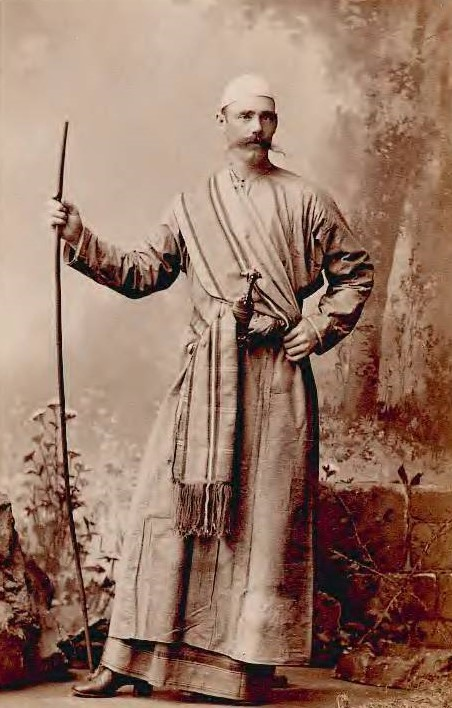
Arvid Wester circa 1885

After signing a three-year-long recruitment contract and attending a colonial school, the Swedes would arrive to the Congo where they would be the third most numerous nationality among mercenaries after Belgians and Italians In fact, the Swedes were so numerous that for a short time, they had their own colonial school in Wavre, Belgium. Many Swedes were to defend stations along the Congo River from a variety of enemies such as Arabs and African natives. One such case was when Arvid Wester with his garrison of 18 men was faced with a hostile force of 700 led by the slave owner Tippu Tip, though the altercation would end bloodless and with a mutual agreement. The Swedes would often put their life at risk when serving in the Force Publique as one-fifth of them would perish while in the Congo.

Aside from military action, the role of the Swedes was that of administration and exploration. The Swedes would greatly aid in the exploration of the Congo as many Swedish sailors would help navigate the Congo River in service of king Leopold II. The mercenary sailors played a vital role in the exploration and Colonization of the Congo as Belgium lacked a proper merchant navy.

=== Oppression of the Congolese locals ===
The European mercenaries serving in the Congo had a very degrading view of the black locals, and the Swedes were no different than their colleagues, not being shy about participating in atrocities. In one instance, the Swede Knut Jacob Theodor Svensson under the pretext of signing a treaty or recruiting carriers had gathered the inhabitants of a village and then opened fire. When the opinions of Europe and Sweden started to shift against Leopold II and his regime, many Swedes would defend their actions as seen in their diaries. In one diary the author would even go so far as to defend the actions of the deny the factuality of the rumors which had spread to Europe by missionaries and natives.

Curiously, this racism and prejudice were not as prevalent when dealing with the people of Zanzibar as they would be seen as civilized enough to die fighting under and with the Swedes.

== Return to Sweden ==
After heightened threats of war in Sweden following the dissolution of the Swedish-Norwegian Union in 1905, some soldiers would be called back for service in the Swedish military. Thereafter in 1908, the growing preference for Belgian and native Congolese soldiers within the Force Publique would greatly aid in diminishing the number of foreign mercenaries in the Congo throughout the 1910s.

Upon returning home, the Swedes would be greatly awarded for their service in the Congo, many rose the ranks when returning to the Swedish military and some would even earn the prestigious medal För tapperhet i fält (for valour on the battlefield).

== Legacy ==
A couple of Swedish Veterans would go on to make books detailing their experiences in the Congo, most notably Tre år i Kongo (Three years in the Congo) which went on to be fairly popular when it first released in 1887. The book was a collection of stories and experiences from Edde Gleerup, Peter August Möller, Georges-Guillaume Pagels, and Erik Wilhelm Dahlgren from whom we now have a much better picture of the Swede's experience in the Congo.

However, even with book coverage, the events covered has failed to reach the consciousness of the Swedish as well as the Congolese public. Despite this, some discussions have emerged about Sweden and colonialism. The overwhelming majority of Swedish articles covering this topic would have a negative view of the Swedes and Force Publique's actions in the Congo.

== See also ==
- Military history of Sweden
- Swedish Brigade
- Scramble for Africa
- Congo Free State
- Force Publique
- För tapperhet i fält
