= Edmond Hanssens =

Belgian soldier and colonial administrator (1843–1884)

Edmond-Winnie-Victor Hanssens
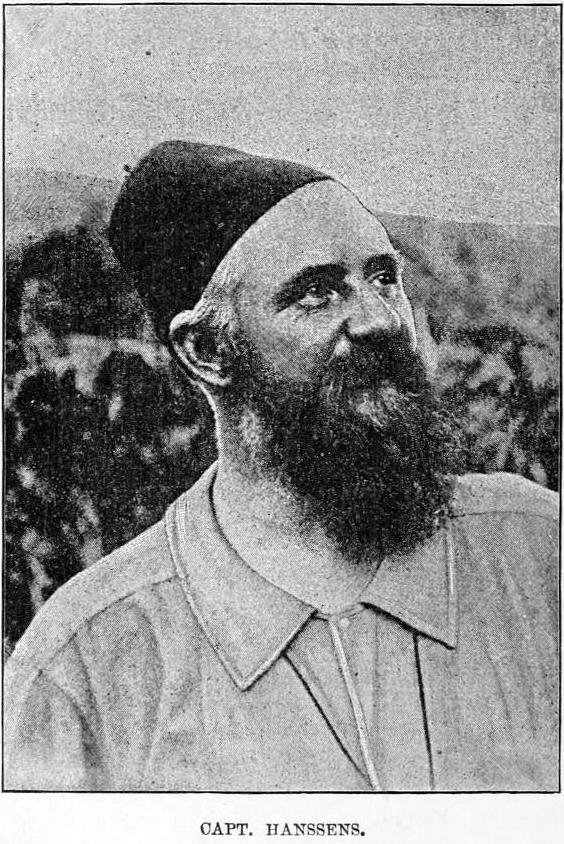
- Hanssens from Stanley's The Congo and the founding of its free state; a story of work and exploration (1885)
- Born: 25 July 1843; Veurne, Belgium
- Died: 28 December 1884 (aged 41); Vivi, Congo
- Occupations: Soldier, explorer, colonial administrator

Edmond-Winnie-Victor Hanssens (25 July 1843 – 28 December 1884) was a Belgian soldier and colonial administrator. He did much to establish the Belgian presence on the Upper Congo River in the last two years of his life.

== Early years (1843–1881) ==
Edmond-Winnie-Victor Hanssens was born in Veurne, Belgium on 25 July 1843. He entered the École Militaire (Military School) on 1 March 1860 and was appointed second lieutenant on 22 March 1862. He was posted to the 11th line regiment. On 3 July 1867 he was appointed lieutenant. He entered the École de Guerre in 1871 and obtained the certificate of deputy état-major in 1875. He was promoted to captain in 1876, and became a tutor of the military art course at the École Militaire.

== Journey to Léopoldville (1881–1882) ==
In 1881 Hanssens volunteered for the Upper Congo Study Committee of the Military Cartographic Institute. He left for Africa at the end of January 1882, and reached Banana on 5 March 1882. With his travelling companions, Lieutenants Joseph Vandevelde, Théodore Nilis and Nicolas Grang, he went up the river to Vivi. There he met Henry Morton Stanley on 4 July 1881. Stanley was exhausted, and was on the way to the coast to return to Europe to recuperate.

Eduard Pechuël-Loesche, the Brussels appointee, assumed leadership in Stanley's place, but Hanssens was given command of the Bas-Congo region, with authority from Vivi to Léopoldville. His main responsibility was to organize the Cataracts region to enable rapid delivery of supplies to Léopoldville. He went up to Léopoldville, which he reached on 3 September 1882, to find that both Pechuel-Loesche and Charles-Marie de Braconnier, the station commander, were sick. Relations with the local Congolese people were poor, food was scarce and morale was low. He encouraged Pechuel Loesche to return to Europe to explain the situation, and was appointed to serve in his place.

== First Upper Congo expedition (1882–1883) ==
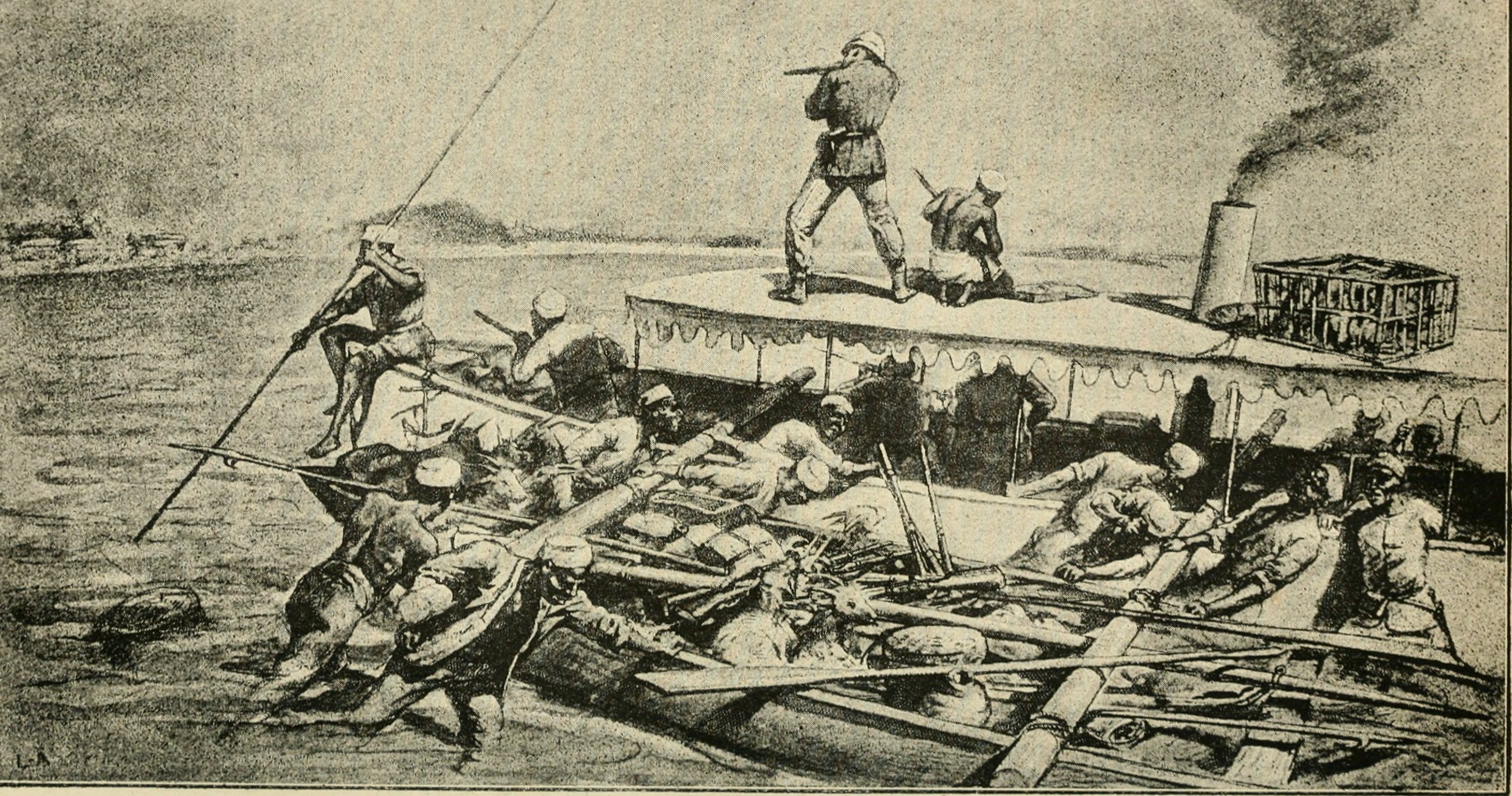
Steamer and pirogue from Coquihat's Sur le Haut-Congo (1888)

Hanssens decided that the posts in the Cataracts district were in good hands, but the Upper Congo was unoccupied and at risk of being taken by the French. The steamer En Avant was immobilized, with an essential component missing that would only be found when Stanley returned. The only available vessel was the whaler Eclaireur. Hanssens sent Braconnier on leave to the coast, and replaced him at Léopoldville by second lieutenant Grang. He began construction of a road from Manyanga to Léopoldville, and renewed relations with the local chief N'Galiema. He decided to set up a depot of food and equipment in M'Suata to supply the future Upper Congo stations, left in the Eclaireur with an agent, Baker, and 11 Zanzibaris on 13 October 1882 and reached M'Suata on 17 October 1882, where Lieutenant Eugène Janssen was in command. He took 12 Zanzibaris from the garrison, and temporarily appointed Boulanger in place of Janssen, who had prepared the expedition up the Congo.

Hanssens headed upstream on 23 October 1882 in the Eclaireur with an escort of two pirogues. He passed the mouth of the Kasai River on 24 October 1882 and passed Tshumbiri on 27 October 1882. On 30 October 1882 he reached Bolobo, where he negotiated for ten days with Kuka, chief of the Bayanzi, who then signed a treaty that placed his lands and people under the protection of the AIA. His crews at once began to build a station. Hanssens sent the Eclaireur back to Léopoldville to collect supplies and to bring back Lieutenant Orban to take command of the new station. On 22 December 1882 lieutenant Camille Coquilhat joined him. Coquilhat had recently arrived from Europe and informed him of the plans by the Haut-Congo Study Committee to establish stations in Équateur and among the Bangalas. Hanssens returned to Léopoldville to organize an expedition for this purpose. On his way he made treaties with the Congolese people at the mouth of the Kasai and acquired land for the Kwamouth post.

== Kouilou-Niari mission (1883) ==
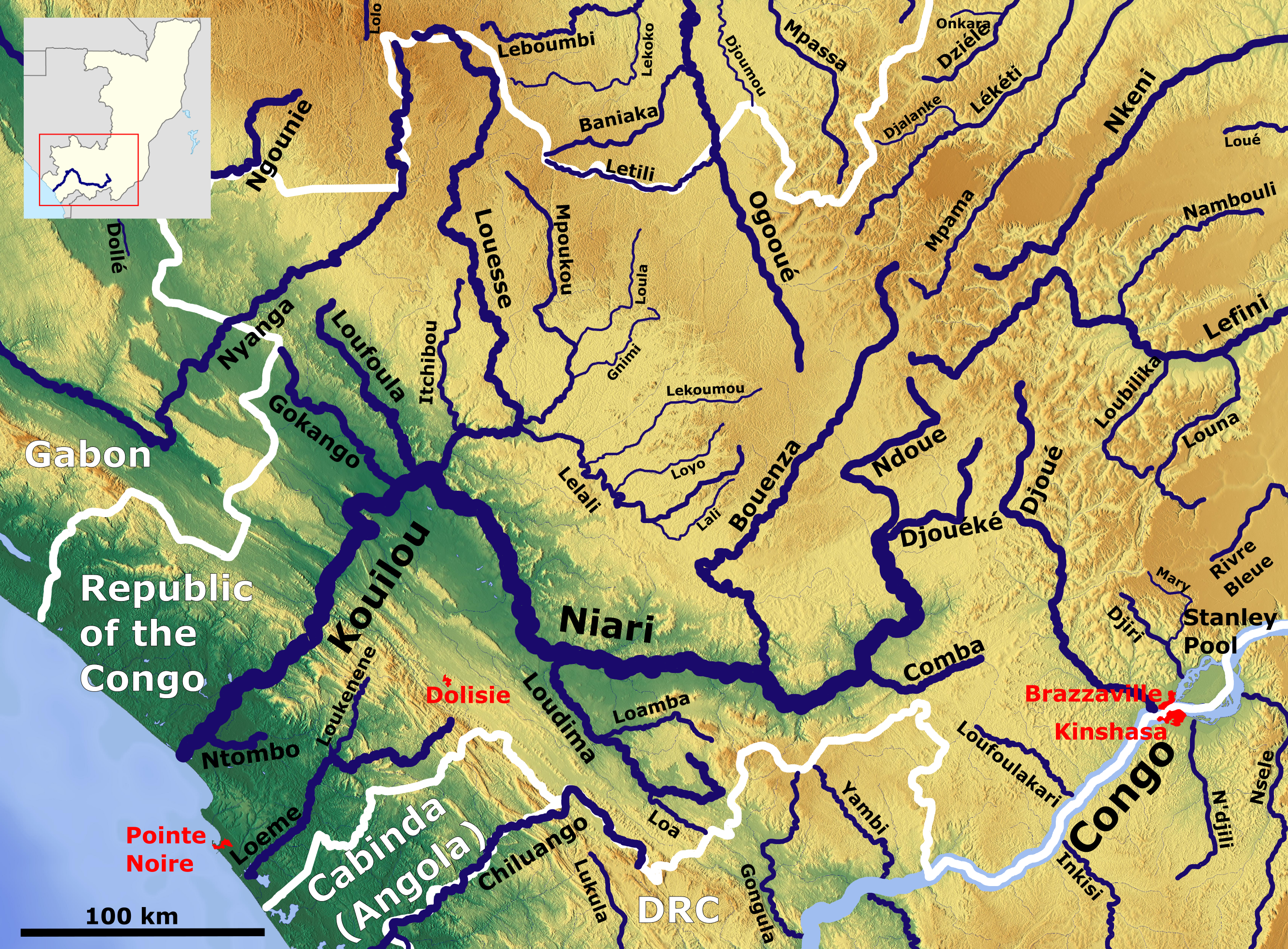
Kouilou-Niari River, entering the Atlantic to the north of the Cabinda Province

Hanssens reached to Léopoldville at the start of January 1883 and heard that Stanley had already returned from Europe and had designated him in command of the entire Kouilou-Niari River basin between the Pool and the Atlantic. Hanssens went down to Manyanga where he met Stanley and received his instructions. On 4 February Stanley 1883 directed him to leave at once for the Upper Kwilu-Niadi, to establish a line of communication between Manyanga and the Kwilu-Niadi, and to continue his explorations downstream until he had joined up with Captain Elliott's party in Stephanieville (Loudima). The operation was in response to a concern by king Leopold II of Belgium that the Portuguese might prevail in their claim to control the mouth of the Congo. If so, Belgium would need an outlet to the Atlantic north of Loango. This was a sensitive task, since Hanssens would have to persuade the Bateke chiefs to give the Belgians priority over the rights granted to Pierre Savorgnan de Brazza for the French, without offending the French expedition.

The expedition had left Vivi on 13 January 1883 under Captain Grant-Elliott, and would have Isangila as a base. Hanssens left Manyanga on 23 February 1883 accompanied by Lieutenant Harou, and travelled through untracked forest. He reached the Niadi at Kindamba, then on 2 April 1883 found its junction with Destrain, in Stéplianieville. Ascending the Niadi he founded the Philippeville post at the limit of the territories granted to de Brazza. The post was founded at the confluence of the Bouenza and Niari rivers on behalf of Belgian interests under the cover of the Haut Congo Study Committee.

On his way back Hanssens was attacked by local people and injured in the foot by a shot from a flintlock. He returned to Manyanga on 20 May 1883 and went down to Boma to have his foot treated. He returned to the upper Niadi to conclude treaties with the local chiefs and founded the post of Mukumbi on the Manyanga-Philippeville route. With this rapid territorial occupation the problem of access to the ocean was solved. However, in 1885 agreements were made with the French and Portuguese that allowed Belgium to withdraw from the area. Hanssens, like other Belgians, used force to compel the local men to serve as porters. In 1883 he burned twenty villages when people refused to work.

== Second Upper Congo expedition (1884) ==

While Hanssens was concerned with organization of the territories below Léopoldville, Stanley undertook to major expeditions in the upper Congo and founded stations at Équateur and Stanley Falls. The Belgians thought it was urgent to occupy the territory between them, but Stanley was exhausted and suffering from liver disease. Hanssens came to meet him in Léopoldville on 15 February 1884, and received order to establish presence in the region between Équateur and the Falls. Hanssens organized an expedition with three small steamers with a total of about 20 tons: the En-Avant, A.I.A. and Royal, and a few small sailboats. There were seven Belgians, about fifty Africans and large amounts of goods and supplies. The flotilla left on 23 March 1884, and stopped at M'Suata, where the commander Janssen had recently drowned accidentally. On 29 March 1884 Hanssens met Pierre de Brazza, and had a friendly discussion. The expedition reached Bolobo on 3 April 1884, where lieutenant Charles Liebrechts had formed a good relationship with the Bayanzi. They continued upstream, founded the N'Gandu post and made treaties with the chiefs along the river.

Hanssens reached Équateurville on 17 April 1884 with the three steamers and six Europeans, Wester, Amelot, Drees, Guérin, Courtois and Nicholls. He found that Alphonse van Gèle and Camille Coquilhat had made it into a model station. At the suggestion of Van Gele and Coquihat, Hanssens interrupted his journey to explore the mouth of the Ubangi River He left in the En Avant on 19 April 1884 with Van Gèle, Courtois, Guérin and Amelot, ten Zanzibaris and one local African as an interpreter. Going downstream the steamer skirted the right bank of the Congo River, but was carried by the current into a maze of islands. After three days they saw some native fishermen in a canoe. Van Gèle managed to persuade them to act as pilots, and after four hours of full steam on 21 April 1884 entered a strong stream of yellow water, the Ubangi, which they ascended to the Bisongo village. They received a friendly reception, and Hanssens exchanged blood with Chief Mkoko. The chief agreed to place both banks of the Ubangi (Note: Ubangi: Hanssens reported on 25 April 1884 that this affluent of the Congo River was called Mbundju at the confluence. It is due to his report (or perhaps George Grenfell's) that resulted in the river being called Mboundgou in the ING map of 1884.) under the protection of the International Association of the Congo. After returning to Equateurville Hanssens left Van Gèle in charge and took Coquihat with him to found the Bangala station, the future Nouvelle Anvers.

On return to Équateur, Hanssens made careful preparation for his expedition to the Bangalas, where he expected to place Coquilhat in command of a new station. He took four of the local people to act as guides and interpreters. The flotilla reached Luluonga on 27 April 1884, where the chiefs signed treaties. On 4 May 1884 it reached Makanza, where the local people were distrustful of the Belgians, having had a bad experience with Stanley. Hanssens landed first, armed only with his pipe and tobacco pouch, and walked through the crowd of armed men to the chief, whom he shook by the hand. This broke the ice, and the chief proposed that they become blood brothers, which was done. According to Hanssens, chief Matabwike said, "We have to receive the white amongst ourselves because the white is good; wherever he makes his villages, he is loved and has the confidence of the people. And proof of this is the presence of these four men from Ukute [the Bakuti], who have left their wives and their homes to follow Nsassi [Hanssens' name] on his voyages and who don't stop speaking well of him and his sons' (Hanssens 1892:39). A treaty was signed on 7 May 1884 and after some haggling it was agreed that the Belgians could build a post at Iboko. Hanssens left for Équateur on 11 May 1884 to obtain more supplies for his journey to the Falls, and returned to Iboko on 24 May 1884, where Coquilhat was organizing the post.

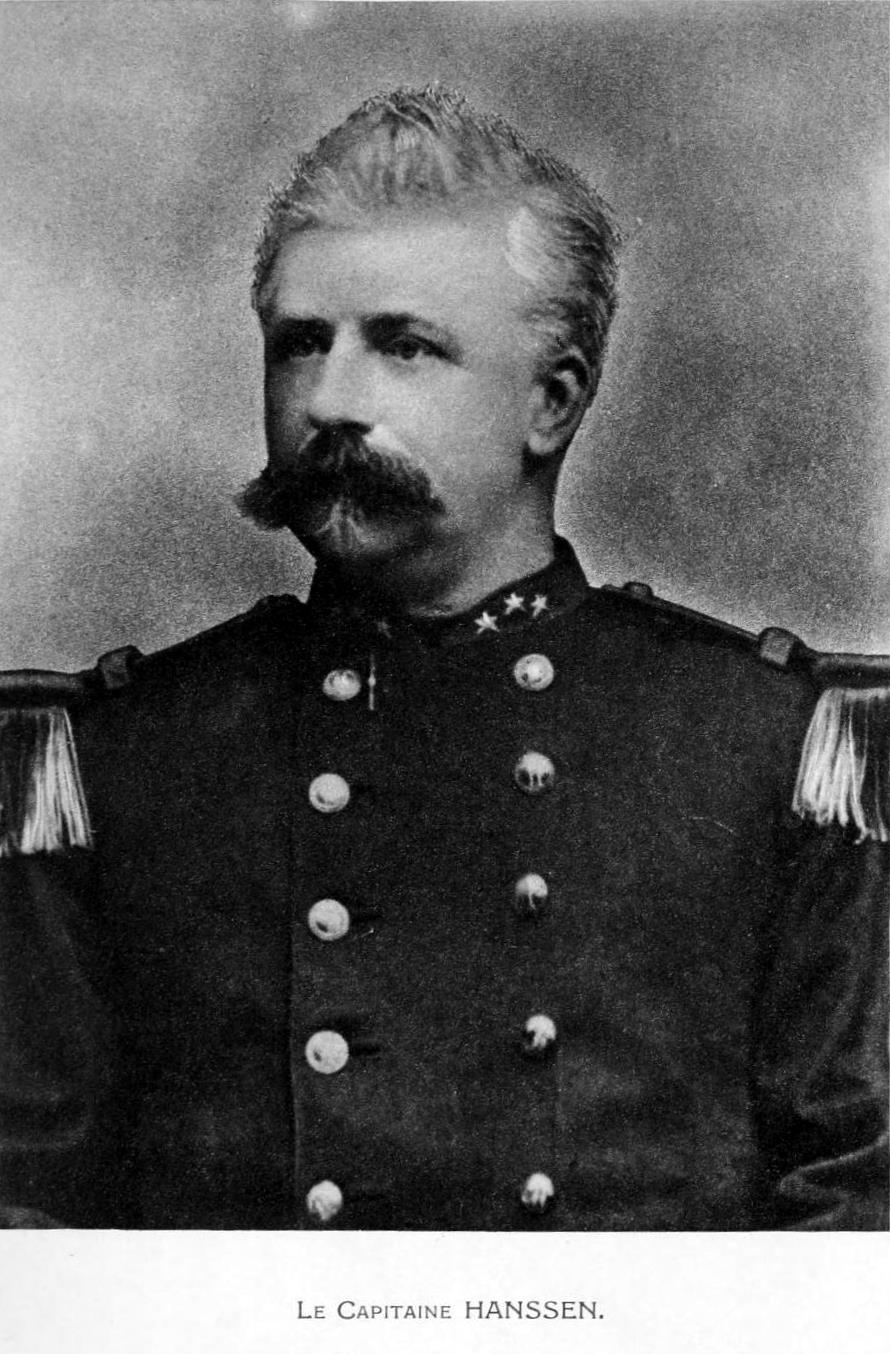
Captain Hanssens

Hanssens left the next day, and briefly explored the Mongala River, signing a treaty with Chief Mobeka near its mouth. On 4 June 1884 the expedition reached the Itimbiri River, and went up it for 15 kilometres (9.3 mi). On 21 June 1884 it reached Basoko at the mouth of the Aruwimi River, where a post of three Hausas was established. Courtois died from hematuria of 26 June 1884. The expedition reached the Falls on 3 July 1884. Hassens relieved Adrian Binnie, who had commanded there since Stanley's visit in December 1883, and would return to the coast. He replaced him with the Swedish Lieutenant Arvid Wester, with Louis-Gustave Amelot as his deputy. On 11 July 1884 Hanssens left the Falls. He travelled along the left bank, and entered the Lomami River. He landed at Iboko on 19 July 1884. The people there were suspicious, since Hanssens had exchanged blood with their enemies, and he stayed for a few days to reassure them that the Belgians wanted friendship with all the tribes, but would not side with one against another.

Hanssens left Iboko on 22 July 1884, and returned to Léopoldville on 6 August 1884. He met the Association's general administrator, Sir Francis de Winton, in Léopoldville. He requested and received the emergency dispatch of supplies and reinforcements for the Bangalas. He then returned upstream to obtain new treaties to confirm the rights of the Association over all the territory between Kwamouth and Bolobo. On 18 October 1884 he was in Bolobo with lieutenant Liebrechts when he learned he had been made a Knight of the Order of Leopold, the first Belgian to receive this award for services in Africa.

== Return to the Vivi and death (1884) ==
Hanssens returned to Léopoldville on 31 October 1884. On 3 November 1884 he heard that the Association planned an expedition to the Basokos to try to free the Italian explorer Casati, who had been captured by the people of the Nepoko on his return from a journey in the Sudan. He assumed he would take command, but three days later announced that he intended to return to Belgium by Portuguese boat that would leave Banana on 17 November 1884. The reason for this decision are not clear. He left Léopoldville on 8 November 1884 after dividing his command into two regions. Guillaume Casman was given the territory from the Pool to Equateur, while Van Gèle took the territory from there to the Falls. Hanssens again met Sir Francis de Winton in Vivi and agreed to postpone taking leave and return to the Upper Congo. However, he fell sick and died of hematuria on 28 December 1884.

== Sources ==
- Boelaert, E. (1952), "Equateurville", Aequatoria (in French), 15e Année (1), Honoré Vinck: 1–12, JSTOR 25838164
- Engels, A. (23 December 1946), "Hanssens (Edmond-Winnie-Victor)", Biographie Coloniale Belge, vol. I, Inst. roy. colon. belge, pp. col. 479–493
- Engels, A. (1951), "Vangele (Alphonse)" (PDF), Biographie Coloniale Belge, vol. 2, Institut royal colonial belge, pp. 928–37
- Lotar, R. P. L. (1937), La Grande Chronique de l'Ubangi (PDF), Institut Royal Colonial Beige
- Moundza, Patrice (2017), Géographie du Congo: Mélanges offerts au Professeur Bonaventure Maurice Mengho, Editions L'Harmattan, ISBN 978-2-14-003259-2
- Samarin, William J. (1984), "Bondjo Ethnicity and Colonial Imagination", Canadian Journal of African Studies, 18 (2), Taylor & Francis, Ltd. on behalf of the Canadian Association of African Studies: 345–365, doi:10.2307/484334, hdl:1807/67136, JSTOR 484334
- Samarin, William J. (2019), The Black Man's Burden: African Colonial Labor On The Congo And Ubangi Rivers, 1880–1900, Taylor & Francis, ISBN 978-1-00-031491-5
- Stanley, Henry Morton (1885), The Congo and the Founding of Its Free State: A Story of Work and Exploration, Cambridge University Press, ISBN 978-1-108-03131-8
