= Georges-Guillaume Pagels =

Georg Vilhelm Pagels
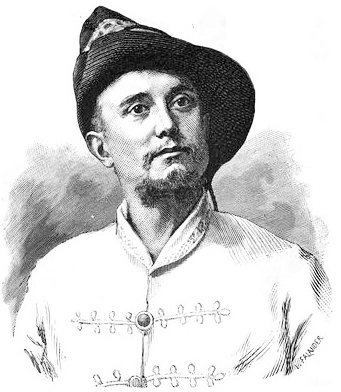
- Georg Pagels. Woodcut by Ida Falander

Head of Équateur Station
- In office March 1886 – March 1886
- Preceded by: Guillaume Casman
- Succeeded by: Charles Liebrechts

Personal details
- Born: 18 February 1855 Lilla-Malma, Södermanland
- Died: 31 March 1891 (aged 36) Gabon
- Occupation: Soldier, colonial administrator

Georg Vilhelm Pagels, or 'Georges-Guillaume Pagels (18 February 1855 – 31 March 1891) was a Swedish officer in the service of the International African Association who briefly commanded Équateur Station (now Mbandaka).

== Early years ==
Georges-Guillaume Pagels was born in Lilla-Malma parish, Södermanland, Sweden on 18 February 1855. His parents were Victor Pagels and Ulrica Nyblaens. He entered the Stockholm Military Academy on 14 July 1875. On 24 November 1876 he was appointed a second lieutenant in the infantry. In 1878 he became a second lieutenant in the Södermanland regiment, and in 1887 a lieutenant in the army.

== Colonial career ==
On 2 March 1883 Pagels took leave from the Swedish army and entered the services of the International African Association (AIA). He was one of a number of Swedes recruited for service in the Congo by King Leopold II of Belgium, apparently on the advice of Henry Morton Stanley, who considered them capable people. On 2 May 1883 he sailed from Liverpool on the Volta. On 12 June 1883 Pagels and Charles Liebrechts left Vivi, at that time the AIA headquarters, en route to Léopoldville. There he was employed by Stanley in freeing Louis-Gustave Amelot and the garrison of Kimpoko station. He was then assigned to Kwamouth to complete setting up a station there. Eugène Janssen had started this, but had died in Msuata on 12 July 1883.

Pagels headed the Kwamouth station for almost two years. At the end of August 1883 Liebrechts visited it on the way up the Congo River to help Êmile Brunfaut in Bolobo station in Bayanzi country, which had been burned down. In November 1883 Liebrechts returned seeking reinforcements and ammunition after Bolobo had been burned again. On 18 January 1884, soon after the third fire at Bolobo, Stanley and Roger arrived on their way down from the Stanley Falls. They inspected the Msuata post, led by the Zanzibari Ali-ben-Joana.

On 13 May 1885 Sir Francis de Winton sent Pagels to Ecuador Station to replace Guillaume Casman, who had died. Pagels believed that "The savage respects nothing but brute strength ... If you have to order physical punishment to a savage, have this punishment carried out with not a muscle in your face betraying your feelings." On 28 August 1885 Pagels gave a thief twenty strokes of the whip. He later advised, "you shall from the start, as a good and reliable ally, use the 'chicotte', cut out of hippopotamus skin, which at every stroke cuts bloody runes Soon after, Liebrechts arrived to take over as station head, accompanied by Edward James Glave. At the end of Paget's term of service, on 23 April 1886 he left from Banana on the Kinsembo.

== Later career ==
Pagels published several articles in the Swedish periodical Ymer, published by the Swedish Society of Anthropology and Geography. Writing in the book Tre år i Kongo of his experience in the Congo in 1887, Pagels described the people of the Congo region as only half human, while the other half was ape-like, typical of the European colonizers of that time. He praised their dog-like devotion. However, he also wrote, "Honesty, integrity and the like, are not esteemed by the savage as good points. Dishonesty, or I would rather say, to be 'artful', is that characteristic which the savages praise exceptionally highly. If at the conclusion of a purchase, or for that matter at any other time, one can cheat one's neighbor, one is considered to have a superior personality... As a rule, the natives were not allowed to cross the threshold of the white man's house, the reason for this is thievishness, which constitutes one of the basic traits in the negro character".

On 30 January 1889 Pagels was awarded the Star of Service. He returned to the Congo in 1890 as a private individual to start trade relations for a Swedish company. He died of a fever in Gabon on 31 March 1891. During his stay in the Congo he made significant ethnographic collections.

== Publications ==
- Gleerup, Edvard; Mōller, P.A.; Pagels, Wilhelm (1887), Tre år i Kongo, Stockholm: P.A. Norstedt

== Sources ==
- Axelson, Sigbert (1970), Culture Confrontation in the Lower Congo (PDF), Falkoping, Sweden: Swedish Institute of Mission Research at Uppsala University / Gummessons Boktryckeri AB
- Gewald, Jan-Bart (2005), Learning to wage and win wars in Africa (PDF), Leiden, The Netherlands: African Studies Centre
- Jadot, J. M. (22 December 1952), "PAGELS (Georges-Guillaume)", Biographie Coloniale Belge (in French), vol. IV, Inst. roy. colon. belge, pp. col. 671–673
- Natermann, Diana Miryong (2018), Pursuing Whiteness in the Colonies: Private Memories from the Congo Freestate and German East Africa (1884-1914), Waxmann Verlag, ISBN 978-3-8309-8690-4
- Sjn, O. (1925), "Pagels, Georg Vilhelm", Nordisk familjebok (second edition supplement) (in Swedish)
