= Louis-Gustave Amelot =

Belgian mechanical engineer

- Born: 25 August 1857; Brussels, Belgium
- Died: 1 December 1884 (aged 27); Mzendu, near Nyangwe, Congo
- Occupations: Mechanical engineer, explorer, administrator

Louis-Gustave Amelot (25 August 1857 – 1 December 1884) was a Belgian mechanical engineer who served with the International African Association, the precursor to the Congo Free State.

== Early years (1857–1881) ==
Louis-Gustave Amelot was born in Brussels on 25 August 1857. He became a mechanical engineer. He entered the service of the International African Association as a mechanic, and left for Africa on 1 September 1881.

== Lower Congo (1881–1883) ==

Amelot stayed in the lower Congo region for about a year, mostly in Vivi, a station commanded by Otto Lindner (1852–1945). In July 1882 the overall commander Henry Morton Stanley, who was sick, came down to Vivi. He assigned Amelot to leave for the interior with Camille Coquilhat, Henri Avaert and Émile Parfonry. They left on 30 September 1882 and reached Manyanga on 17 October 1882. Amelot had to return. He was suffering from ulcers on his legs, and went down to Banana to recuperate, where he met Camille Coquilhat.

== Stanley Pool (1883–1884) ==
In March 1883 there were rumors of a revolt, and Amelot accompanied Théodore Nilis and Joseph Vandevelde to come to the aid of Parfonry, who was head of the Isangila station. With the arrival of reinforcements the problem was resolved, and Amelot continued on to Manyanga. In May Stanley named him as interim commander of the Lutete post, which Alphonse van Gèle had just founded. In June he was appointed commander of Kimpoko station. At Kimpoko Amelot got into an argument with a chief and six of his headmen over the rotting carcass of a hippopotamus, which resulted in their being killed. Soon there were rumors that the post was in danger, and Stanley ordered the complete evacuation of its staff and equipment to Léopoldville. The newly-arrived Swedish officer Georges-Guillaume Pagels was tasked with helping the garrison leave.

== Upper Congo (1884) ==
Some time before February 1884 Amelot requested permission to leave the Congo before the end of his term. However, on 25 March 1884 Amelot left Léopoldville in Captain Edmond Hanssens' expedition to the Upper Congo. Amelot owned an accordion, which he played well, and entertained the members of the expedition. On 17 April 1884 they arrived in Équateurville. Two days later Hanssens and Van Gèle set out in the En Avant to explore the Ubangi River with the pharmacist Courtois, de Guérin and the mechanic Amelot, a crew of ten Zanzibaris and a local African who was to act as their interpreter. Going downstream the steamer skirted the right bank of the Congo River, but was carried by the current into a maze of islands. After three days they saw some native fishermen in a canoe. Van Gèle managed to persuade them to act as pilots, and after four hours of full steam on 21 April 1884 entered a strong stream of yellow water, the Ubangi, which they ascended to the Bisongo village. They received a friendly reception, and Hanssens exchanged blood with Chief Mkoko. The chief agreed to place both banks of the Ubangi under the protection of the International African Association.

Amelot continued with the expedition and participated in the establishment of the Bangala station and the explorations of the Mongala, Itimbiri and Aruwimi rivers. A comic melange of tunes he had composed for his accordion called the Hymne de l'Équateur helped break the ice with the local people they encountered. The expedition arrived at the Stanley Falls on 3 July 1884. Hanssens relieved Adrian Binnie, who had commanded there since Henry Morton Stanley's visit in December 1883, and would return to the coast. He replaced him by Arvid Wester, with Amelot as deputy. On 11 July 1884 Hanssens left the Falls. Amelot's signature as a witness is on an agreement (in English) of 18 October 1884 between Tipu Tip's son Moniamani and Lieutenant Wester in which Moniamani promised that no Arab would come to the river below the 7th Cataract of Stanley, or to the west of that point.

In November 1884 Van Gèle arrived at the Falls. Amelot's term of service had expired, and he asked for permission to return to Europe by way of Nyangwe and the east coast of Africa. He left the Falls at the end of November, and died of hematuria at Mzendu, near Nyangwe, on 1 December 1884.

== Sources ==
- Bontinck, François (1974), L'autobiographie de Hamed ben Mohammed el-Murjebi Tippo Tip (ca. 1840-1905) (PDF), Bruxelles: Académie royale des Sciences d’Outre-Mer
- Coquilhat, Camille (1888), Sur le Haut-Congo (PDF) (in French), J. Lebègue
- Daerden, Peter; Wynants, Maurits (2005), Inventory of the Henry M. Stanley Archives (PDF), Tervuren: Royal Museum for Central Africa
- Engels, A. (23 December 1946), "HANSSENS (Edmond-Winnie-Victor)", Biographie Coloniale Belge, vol. I, Inst. roy. colon. belge, pp. col. 479–493
- Engels, A. (31 July 1947), "AMELOT (Louis-Gustave)", Biographie Coloniale Belge (in French), vol. I, Inst. roy. colon. belge, pp. 22–24
- Engels, A. (1951), "Vangele (Alphonse)" (PDF), Biographie Coloniale Belge, vol. 2, Institut royal colonial belge, pp. 928–37
- Jadot, J. M. (22 December 1952), "PAGELS (Georges-Guillaume)", Biographie Coloniale Belge (in French), vol. IV, Inst. roy. colon. belge, pp. col. 671–673
- Jeal, Tim (2011-10-06), Stanley: Africa's Greatest Explorer, Faber & Faber, ISBN 978-0-571-26564-0
- Lotar, R. P. L. (1937), La Grande Chronique de l'Ubangi (PDF), Institut Royal Colonial Beige
