= Peter August Möller =

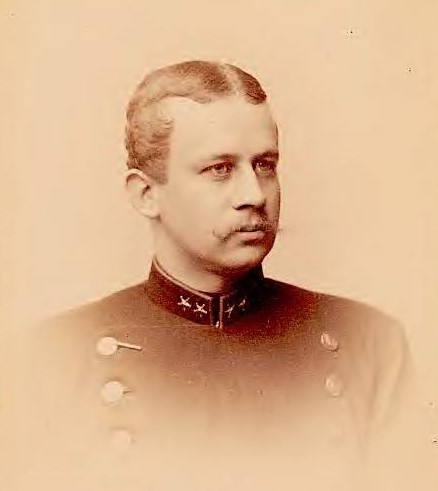
- Born: 11 April 1858; Flo Parish
- Died: 4 April 1951 (aged 92); Stockholm
- Occupations: Soldier, author

Peter August Möller (11 April 1858 – 4 April 1951) was a Swedish soldier, traveler, hunter and author.

== Family ==
Peter August Möller was born on 11 April 1858 in Flo Parish, Västergötland, Sweden. He was the son of the wholesaler Peter Möller and Augusta Cneiff. He married Rosa Wall, daughter of Dagens Nyheter's founder Rudolf Wall. He married a second time to Vendela Schmidt. His sister married the explorer Edde Gleerup. He died on 4 April 1951 in Stockholm, Sweden.

== Military career ==
In 1890, Möller became a lieutenant in the Västgöta-Dal regiment and in 1896 a captain. In 1897 he resigned with permission to remain as a captain in the regiment's reserve, which lasted until 1908.

== Travel and hunting ==
Möller was in the service of the Congo Free State between 1883 and 1886, first as a station manager, later as district manager. Among other things, he headed the Matadi station. He spent much time hunting elephants. In the years 1895–1896 he undertook an expedition through Angola and Namibia. He has described his experiences in Africa first in Tre år i Kongo (Three Years in the Congo) (1887), then in Resa i Afrika genom Angola, Ovampo och Damaraland (Travel in Africa through Angola, Ovampo and Damaraland) (1899). Among other things, he devoted himself to hunting African buffalo. Möller passed the Bundi River when travelling from Vivi to Isangila in the lower Congo. He wrote in 1887:

During our march to Issangila we encamped in the valley of the Bundi river, which is known for its great richness in buffaloes and antelopes of different kinds. We could also observe numerous trails of these animals everywhere. Parts of the river-bed was moreover beaten by hippopotami, that obviously were grazing there [at] night. It was thus very tempting to me to stay there, but our journey did not allow it. I comforted therefore myself with my hopes of having the opportunity to come back to this rich hunting ground in the future.(Möller 1887:49)

In 1898–1913 Möller sat on the board of Skidfrämjandet (Association for the Promotion of Skiing in Sweden) and was a pioneer among the Swedish mountains. He led ski trips for school children to Dalarna in 1903 and 1904. He wrote Om skidlöpning (On Skiing) (1909).

In 1899 and 1900 Möller traveled through South and Central America. In 1901–1902 he twice rode over the Pampas and the Andes. He killed five bears during a bear hunt in Karelia in 1903. He established a coffee plantation in Kenya in British East Africa in 1911. During 1910–1914 in East Africa, he devoted himself to hunting lions and rhinos. He returned to Africa in 1926, at the age of 70, and bought coffee plantations in Tanganyika . He climbed Mount Kilimanjaro in 1928. The peak was reached after four days of hiking from the Maranga plateau.

== Sources ==
- Flo kyrkoarkiv, Födelse- och dopböcker, SE/GLA/13116/C/3 (1851-1860), bildid: C0047163_00028, sida 40 (Flo church archives (1851-1860) (in Swedish)
- Friedman, Kajsa Ekholm (1991), Catastrophe and Creation: The Transformation of an African Culture, Psychology Press, ISBN 978-3-7186-5186-3
- "Möller, Peter August", Nordisk familjebok (in Swedish) (2 ed.), 1913, p. 315
- Nordisk familjeboks sportlexikon, supplementbandet (in Swedish), 1949
- William-Jörgensen, Mikael; Margareta, Hartelius (10 October 2004), "*Peter* August Möller", Vår släktforskning (in Swedish)
