= Charles Liebrechts =

Belgian soldier, explorer and administrator

Charles Adolphe Marie Liebrechts
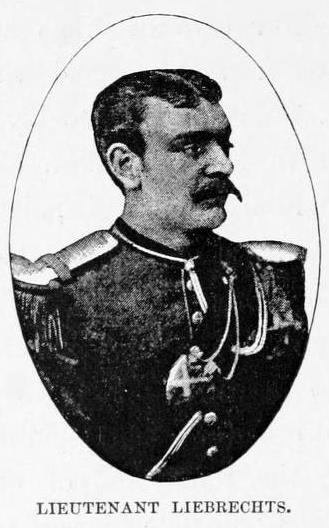
- Liebrechts from Stanley's Founding of Congo Free State 1885
- Born: 7 May 1858; Antwerp, Belgium
- Died: 14 July 1938 (aged 80); Brussels, Belgium
- Occupations: Soldier, explorer and administrator

Charles Adolphe Marie Liebrechts (7 May 1858 – 14 July 1938) was a Belgian soldier, explorer and administrator in the Congo Free State.

== Early years (1858–1882) ==
Charles Adolphe Marie Liebrechts was born in Antwerp on 7 May 1858. His parents were François Liebrechts and Marie Huybrechts. At the age of 16 he enlisted in the army. He became a soldier in the 3rd chasseurs à pied. He entered the Military School in 1876, specializing in artillery and engineering. In 1881 he was appointed second lieutenant of artillery in the 5th regiment.

King Leopold II of Belgium decided that his Force Publique in the Congo, still publicly seen as part of the International African Association, needed an artillery man. He asked General Nicaise to find the best candidate, and at the end of 1882 the general recommended Liebrechts, who was given instructions by the king in person.

== Congo (1883–1889) ==
On 7 March 1883 Lieutenant Liebechts embarked in Liverpool on the Biafra with two batteries of mountain artillery. He transported the guns to the upper Congo River. In Léopoldville he found Henry Morton Stanley organizing a large expedition to found two new posts. He joined the expedition with one of his pieces, a Krupp cannon. In Bolobo Stanley resolved a dispute between the staff of the station and a local chief, then gave command to Liebrechts. The local people wanted the Europeans to leave, and in November 1883 burned down the station's buildings.

A flotilla under Edmond Hanssens left Léopoldville on 23 March 1884. The expedition reach Bolobo on 3 April 1884, where lieutenant Liebrechts had now formed a good relationship with the Bayanzi. They continued upstream, founded the N'Gandu post and made treaties with the chiefs along the river. On 11 November 1884 Hanssens again left Léopoldville for Équateur in an expedition with three steamers: the Royal, A.I.A. and En Avant. The members included Guillaume Casman, Liebrechts and Camille Van den Plas. They stopped at Kimpoko to embark Edde Gleerup, who had been appointed second to Arvid Wester at the Falls. On 24 November 1884 they reached Msuata, where Liebrechts stayed, and where they met Giacomo Savorgnan di Brazzà and Attilio Pécile, of the French mission, who were going by canoe to the Alima.

In 1885 Liebrechts was given command of the Equateur station. Liebrechts left the Congo on leave in June 1886. On 2 February 1887 he left Antwerp to return to the Congo. He was in charge of the strategic center of Léopoldville, from which all of the upper Congo was supplied. He was active in developing the station and the port infrastructure.

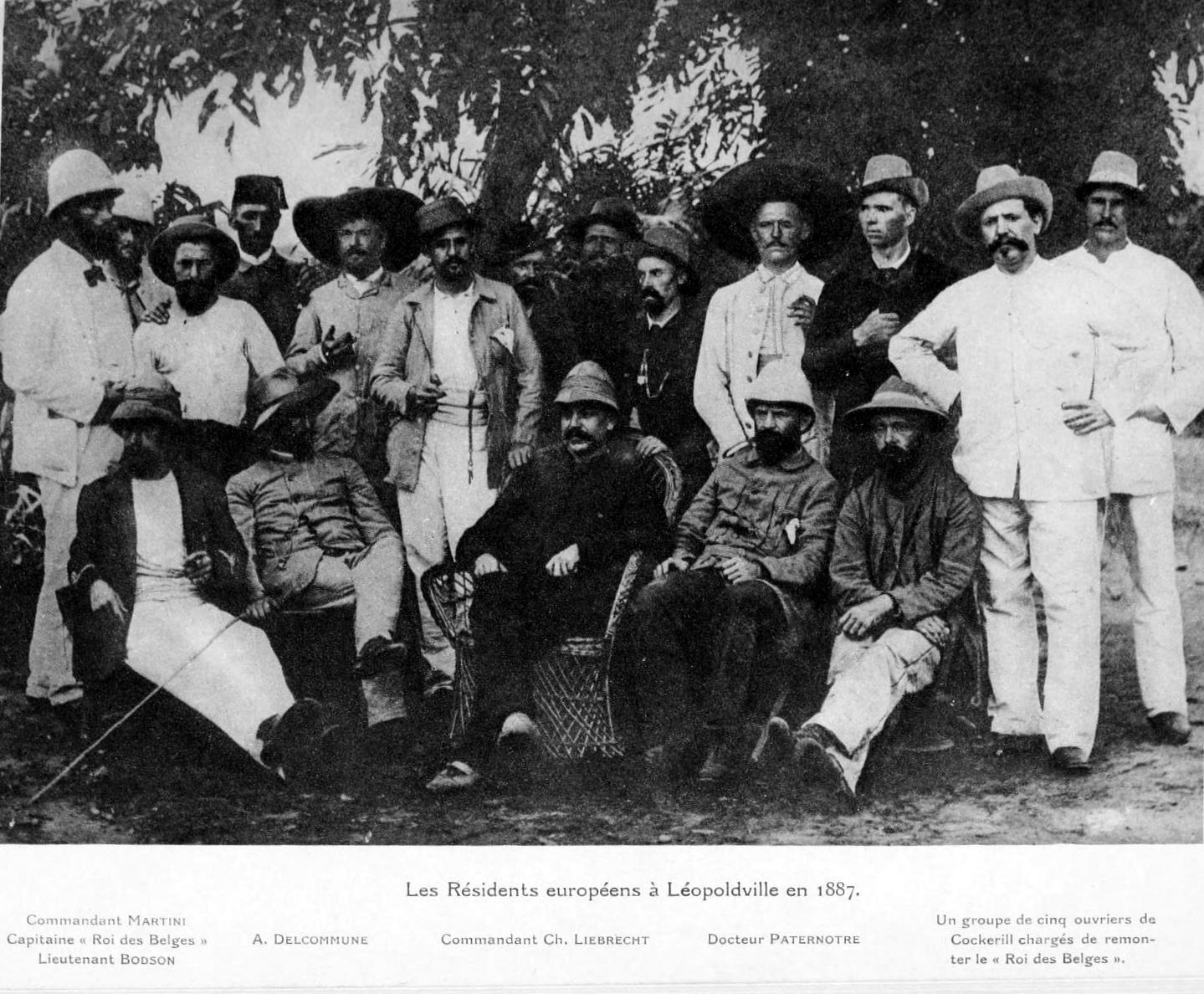
Liebrechts (center) in Léopoldville, 1887

Stanley arrived in Léopoldville with the Emin Pasha Relief Expedition, and Liebrechts managed to provide him with the steamers he needed. He then devoted himself to organizing the workshops, slipway, stores and supply of the station. In March 1888 the shipyards launched the Roi des Belges for the Compagnie du Congo pour le Commerce et l'Industrie. In October 1888 the Ville de Bruxelles was launched, a 35-ton steamer with a wooden hull made from timber from the Lukolela forest. On 27 October 1888 Liebrechts was appointed district commissioner 1st class. He left Léopoldville on 17 March 1889 and arrived in Brussels in May 1899. On 20.06.1889 he married Marguerite Deymann in Schaerbeek,

== Central administration (1889–1909) ==
Liebrechts joined the colony's central administration in Belgium and was put in charge of the Interior Division of the Congo Free State under governor general Camille Janssen. The department was very active in 1889–1891 in efforts to expand towards the Nile to the northeast and Katanga to the southeast. It was also involved in diplomatic work at the Brussels Anti-Slavery Conference, where Liebrechts was a technical delegate of the Congo Free State. In July 1891 he was appointed secretary general of the interior, replacing Théophile Wahis, who became vice-governor of the Congo. His promotion must have been due to the influence of Secretary of State Edmond van Eetvelde, who was head of the Belgian Interior and Foreign Affairs department from 1890. Liebrechts and van Eetvelde had common views of the danger of expanding towards the Nile, which the king wanted to happen.

When Van Eetvelde retired in 1898 Liebrechts gained more political influence, although the king was still in control of the departments, and would have seen Liebrechts only as a department head. During the period of the Commission of Inquiry of 1905-1906, there was some suspicion that Liebrechts was compromised with the concessionary companies, particularly the Société Anversoise de Commerce au Congo, of which his father-in-law was a co-founder and shareholder, and his brother Louis Liebrechts was director in Africa. Judge Marcellin De Saegher said that Louis Liebrechts was the author of several crimes against the local population, with Charles Liebrechts covering for him in Brussels. Based on the archives it seems that Liebrechts followed the king's position in generally downplaying the atrocities, but was not involved in specific cases involving his brother. On 15 November 1908 the Congo Free State was annexed by Belgium as the Belgian Congo, and Liebrecht's mandate ended.

== Later career (1909–1938) ==
Before the outbreak of World War I in 1914 Liebrecht started to play a role in the business world with companies such as the Société commerciale et financière africaine. After the war he became a director of companies such as Chemin de fer du Congo supérieur aux Grands Lacs (CFL), Compagnie belge maritime du Congo, Compagnie du Kasaï and John Cockerill. He was also the government's delegate to the Compagnie du Katanga and the Belgian Congo's delegate to the Chemin de fer du Bas-Congo au Katanga (BCK). In 1928 he became a full member of the Technical Sciences section of the newly formed Royal Belgian Colonial Institute. In 1933 King Albert I made him a knight. Throughout his life Liebrechts defended the Congo Free State and King Léopold II. Liebrechts died on 14 July 1938 in Brussels.

== Publications ==
- Liebrechts (Ch.) (1920), Congo : suite à mes souvenirs d'Afrique : vingt années à l'Administration centrale de l'Etat indépendant du Congo (1889-1908), Bruxelles: Office de Publicité
- Liebrechts (Ch.) (1932), Léopold II, fondateur d'empire, Bruxelles: Office de Publicité
- Liebrechts (Ch.) (1909), Souvenirs d'Afrique : Congo : Léopoldville, Bolobo, Equateur (1883-1889), Bruxelles: Lebègue

== Sources ==
- Engels, A. (23 December 1946), "HANSSENS (Edmond-Winnie-Victor)", Biographie Coloniale Belge (in French), vol. I, Inst. roy. colon. belge, pp. col. 479–493
- Moulaert, G. (12 February 1952), "LIEBRECHTS (Charles Adolphe Marie)", Biographie Coloniale Belge (in French), vol. III, Inst. roy. colon. belge, pp. col. 556-56
- Plasman, Pierre-Luc (5 July 2012), LIEBRECHTS (Charles) (in French), Koninklijke Academie voor Overzeese Wetenschappen
- Coosemans, M. (21 May 1948), "CASMAN (Guillaume-Camille)" (PDF), Biographie Belge d'Outre-Mer (in French), vol. II, Académie Royale des Sciences d'Outre-Mer, pp. 143–147
