= White people in the Democratic Republic of the Congo =

Racial and multi-ethnic group

Total population
- 115,157 in 1959

Regions with significant populations
- Kinshasa, Lubumbashi, Boma and Kisangani.

Languages
- French, Dutch/Flemish (minority)

Religion
- Mostly Roman Catholics and some Jews

Related ethnic groups
- Belgians, Greeks

The White Congolese consisted of European and White American settlers during the times of the Congo Free State and Belgian Congo. Though the majority of them were Belgian, a variety of European nationalities were present. Most were temporary workers, but there was a small population of true colonists and multi-generational families that numbered between 2,500 to 3,000 people. During the Congo Crisis, nearly all White people had fled to Europe and the neighboring African nations, though a large portion had remained in the breakaway state of Katanga where Belgium had retained control until 1963. After which primarily White missionaries had remained in or returned to the independent Congo.

== History ==
In 1878, Leopold II deployed explorer Henry Morton Stanley under the International Association of the Congo to further his interests in the region. The Berlin Conference legitimised Leopold's rule in the Congo leading to the creation of the Congo Free State in 1885.

European settlement in the Belgian Congo is tied to the creation of the Belgian colonial empire. During the existence of the Congo Free State, the European population was estimated at 1,500. There was 120 Belgian officers in the Force Publique in 1892 and 170 (of which 132 died) European workers were brought in during the construction of the Matadi–Leopoldville railway between 1889 and 1898. In 1901, 958 Whites were recorded.

Following the formation of the Belgian Congo, there was 6,266 Europeans in 1918 of which 3,263 were Belgian. The White population was at 25,179 in 1925. It plummeted to 17,000 in 1930 and dropped again in 1934 to 11,000. Prior to World War II, in 1938 the population was at 23,000. During the German invasion of Belgium in 1940, the European population in the Congo was at 29,791 with another 1,404 in Ruanda-Urundi. Post-World War II, European settlement steadily increased until 1960. In 1947, Europeans only numbered 24,000, but grew to 112,759 by 1958. By the end of 1959, the White Congolese population was 115,157 which included 1,900 agricultural settlers and technicians.

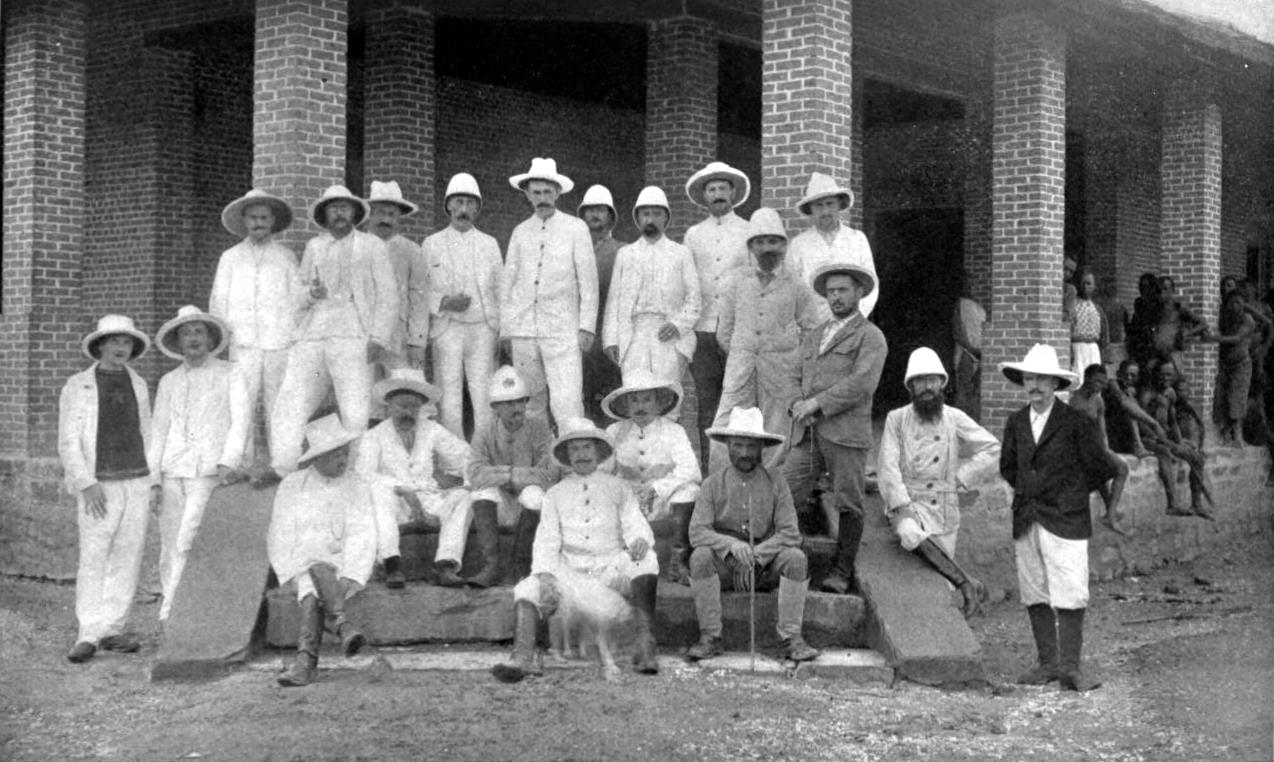
Europeans pose for the camera in Stanleyville (modern-day Kisangani) under the Congo Free State in 1902

The Europeans fell into two groups: the colons, genuine settlers and the coloniaux, the colonial Europeans who came to Africa for temporary employment, working for either large private companies, for the state as civil servants, or with religious organizations as teachers and missionaries. The colons were a minority, numbering somewhere between 2,500 to 3,000 people while the coloniaux formed the vast majority of Whites in Belgian Congo with their numbers over 100,000 by 1959.

== Decline ==
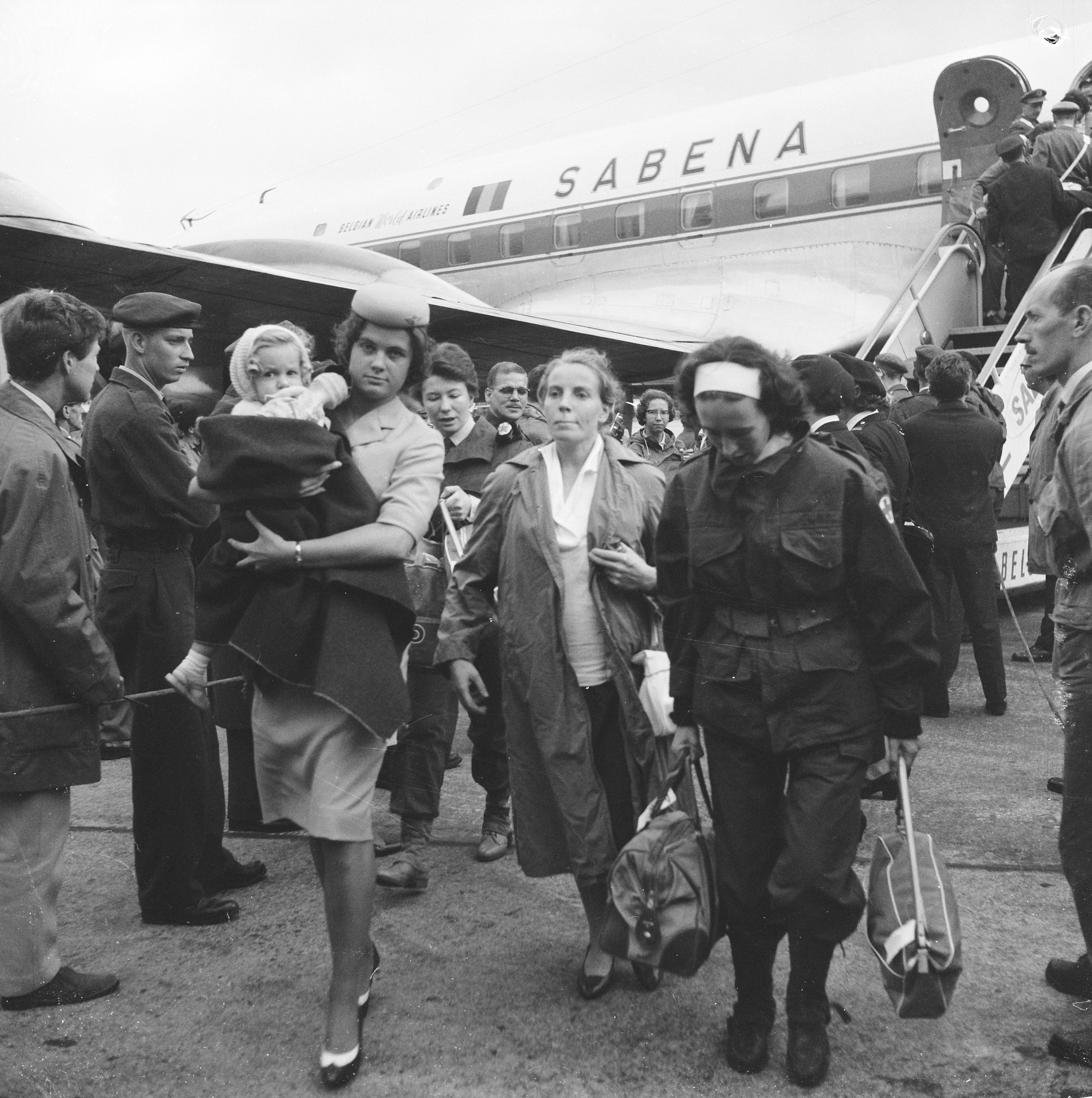
Belgian refugees return to Brussels in July 1960 during the Congo Crisis

Just 5 days after the Congo's independence on June 30, 1960, Congolese soldiers mutinied against their White officers and within 11 days violence and looting became widespread in the country. Though acts of violence towards White civilians occurred across the country, some events were exaggerated which led to mass hysteria. Not soon after the White Congolese began to flee to Europe and into the neighboring countries. The first White casualties occurred on July 9 with the murder of five Europeans and an Italian consul in Elisabethville. The violence and collapse of the Congolese government fueled Belgian intervention and on the following day, July 10, Belgian paratroopers invaded Congo. Soon after, Katanga seceded on July 11. During this time, Belgian troops prevented White technicians and administrators from fleeing Katanga and facilitated the return of other White Congolese.

Whites in Leopoldville fled to Brazzaville, those in and around Thysville fled into Portuguese Angola, and those in the eastern provinces fled into Ruanda-Urundi, Uganda, Kenya, or Tanganyika. Some also fled to South Kasai and Katanga where Belgium was able to maintain order, thought many of the women and children fled into the Rhodesias while their husbands stayed behind. It's estimated that about 10,000 refugees, mainly women and children, had entered the Central African Federation within the first few days.

The Belgian government diverted Sabena aircraft to evacuate citizens, while other large-scale airlift operations were conducted by the Netherlands, France, Italy, and Portugal. Around 40,000 white refugees had fled within a two week period in July 1960.

The White communities in other African colonies took them in as refugees. Approximately 5,000 fled to the Rhodesias between 1961 and 1965. South Africa notably set up a trust that provided aid with the purpose of coordinating a pathway for refugees to permanently settle there. The South African government paid for their travel, lodging, food and organized employment for them, and even South African citizens allowed them to live with them. South Africa sent recruiters to Salisbury, Nairobi, Bulawayo, Luanda, and Brazzaville to assist and convince the White Congolese to settle in South Africa. A "considerable" number of refugees that did want to immigrate were Italians, Greeks, Cypriots, and Maltese, but they were considered "undesirable" as mentioned by the South African High Commissioner in Salisbury, Harold Taswell.

Most refugees generally had a lukewarm response to the South African aid, with many returning to either Europe or to Katanga due to "contractual obligations," while some turned the aid down due to pride. Of the refugees that stayed in South Africa, their experiences were mixed due to issues with employment. Doctors, lawyers and engineers needed to obtain a South African degree to be able to be employed. Farmers who specialized in tropical climates were unable to apply their skills and struggled to find suitable land without major capital investment. Other sectors were also difficult for refugees to break into either due age or language barriers, and ultimately many had to take jobs that weren't related to their qualifications. In addition the South African wage was not comparable to Congolese one. Only about a fifth of these refugees would remain in South Africa, mostly with the hope of eventually returning to Congo.

It was common for the refugees to abuse the South African aid system with some treating the experience as a holiday while others racked up copious amounts debt before returning to Belgium. Despite all the effort that South Africa put into encouraging them to stay, they stopped provided aid by the end August 1960, with the aid organizations and South African citizens wanted them returned. It's estimated that 2,342 White Congolese refugees had entered South Africa by the end of 1960, but only 748 had applied for residence. 5.5 million rands in today's currency had been spent by South Africa through this endeavor.

In 2008, there was around 30,000 former colonials in Belgium.

As of 2024, 2,746 Belgian citizens reside in the Congo.

== Katanga ==
Katanga was an economically prominent region of the Belgian Congo that was dominated by colonial enterprises, such as the Union Minière du Haut-Katanga. It owned between 40% to 50% of Congo's enterprises in 1959. Between 1910 to 1920, the mines and railroads in Katanga employed White workers, but in 1920, they challenged the colonial administration by forming an illegal trade union. After a prolonged and sometimes violent struggle, the movement was broken apart and then quashed by the Great Depression. Migrant African workers would be brought in to work the mines and railroads, usually a period of three to twelve months and then forced to return to their original homes.

In 1960, the State of Katanga broke-away from the Republic of Congo. At this time Katanga was very urban with miles of roads and railways, self-sustaining agriculture, and had a much higher income than the rest of the country due to its economy revolving around mining. Katanga also had a larger White population, numbering 33,918 in 1960 or 2.08% of the total population of Katanga and a third of all Whites in the Belgian Congo. In 1962, Irish diplomat Conor Cruise O'Brien wrote that there was about "30,000 or so" Europeans in Katanga.

The White Katangese were a unique subgroup of settlers in the Belgian Congo. They came from skilled and professional classes, and were much more attached to province than settlers up north. They were hostile to the central government who they felt encroached on Katanga's status. The White Katangese were also close to the White communities in Rhodesia and other nearby African countries. Early separatists plans included forming a union with the white-minority governments of Rhodesia, Nyasaland, South Africa, Angola and Mozambique as a "barrier to black Africa."

Prior to the breakaway, in 1957 settlers set up political parties that defended against native nationalism. The Union pour la Colonisation du Katanga (Union for the Colonization of Katanga, UCOL-Katanga), founded in 1944, was a White settler organization and advocacy group turned political party, with the purpose of "securing for the White population of Katanga the liberties granted by the Belgian constitution, and to promote, by all available means, the growth of European colonization." Another was the Union Katangaise a European party which favored a "Belgian-Katangese community," and White settlement. Both parties wanted to build permanent White populations similar to South Africa, but they were not popular and thus co-opted a message that would align their aims with the native Congolese.

Katanga seceded under the leadership of CONAKAT, a pro-European, African political party that was supported by UCOL-Katanga, the Union Katangaise, and professional elites which included businesses, lawyers, and influential European residents. Kataganda's president Moïse Tshombe, had White advisers and colleagues who he consulted during the secession and brought in European and White African mercenaries. Despite Belgium's support for Katanga, it never officially recognized the state.

== Economic Activities ==
Belgian authorities wanted to pursue an elitist colonization and discouraged large scale immigration of settlers, especially poor Whites, instead mainly sending skilled workers. The large-scale industries in the colony, like mining and agriculture, struggled with indigenous labor shortages, but were against bringing more White settlers. Between the 1930s and 1950s there was a small movement in favor of independent, White-run businesses, especially in the farming sector, but this barely influenced the government. It was only during the last fifteen years of the colony that Belgian colonial authorities began to facilitate these small businesses. By 1956 there was 9,362 independently run White businesses, but settlers were largely neglected by government which favored the large companies. In 1959, close to half of all settlers worked in private enterprises followed by smaller numbers that worked as civil servants, farmers, and missionaries.

== Demographics ==
Initially, Belgians only made up a plurality of Europeans in the Belgian Congo, at 40% in 1890. As colonial enterprises grew, so did the number of Belgian settlers, where they numbered between 56% and 65% of all Europeans through the years. At their peak in 1959 they made up close to four-fifths of all Whites. Belgians made up 0.08% of the total Congolese population in 1925 and 0.6% in 1959. With non-Belgian Whites included, these numbers raise to 0.13% in 1925 and 0.8% in 1959. The non-African population in the Belgian Congo in 1959 was recorded as: 87,736 Belgians, 5,361 Portuguese, 3,718 Italians, 3,483 Greeks, 2,380 French, 2,674 British, 2,030 Americans, 1,357 Dutch, 825 Swiss, and 539 Luxembourgers. Smaller numbers of other White settlers were also present.

The early White population was disproportionately young men with adult women only being 21% of the settler population in 1925. The Belgian authorities were convinced that celibacy would lead to greater profitability and limited the immigration of women until 1947. This number of women gradually increased to 35% in the 1950s and was at 46% by 1960.

=== Luxembourgers ===
See Also: Luxembourgish Colonial History (in Luxembourgish)

Even though the Grand Duchy of Luxembourg was not a colonial power, it was an active participant in the colonization of the Belgian Congo. Between 1921 and 1922, Belgium and Luxembourg formed an economic union that granted Luxembourgers the same rights as Belgians in their colonies. By late 1925, the Luxembourgish colonial association, the Cercle Colonial Luxembourgeois (CCL) was established and was widely supported receiving subsidies from the Grand Duchy and fiancianing from the Belgian Minister of the Colonies, the grand ducal family, and from Joseph Bech, the Prime Minister. In 1928 there was also "Grand Ducal Committee for the Creation of Colonial Settlements" which was linked to Prince Félix and the Belgian Prime Minister, Henri Jaspar, both who advocated for a Luxembourgish concession in the Congo. Plans for the concession were however abandoned in 1929 in favor of one in Portuguese Mozambique. By 1947, Belgian or Luxembourgish citizenship was a formal requirement to apply for positions in colonial administration.

There was an active campaign to recruit colonial workers from Luxembourg from the mid 1880s until the 1960s. Men and women from Luxembourg voluntarily emigrated to the colonies where they filled several different roles: soldiers, scientists, missionaries, and as colonial officials. The first wave of settlers were mainly soldiers in the Force Publique, but also included missionaries and civil servants. During the construction of the Matadi–Leopoldville railway, around 15 engineers from Luxembourg were brought in to help construct it, under the supervision of Nicolas Cito. Following construction of the rail, Cito was appointed consul general in Brussels and became a proponent for Luxembourgish colonial activities. A district in Kalamu, a commune in Kinshasa was formerly known as Cité Cito until 1974.

Luxembourger settlers predominantly came from high class social backgrounds, with many securing placements in the colony through personal and professional recommendations. Most were motivated to move for economic improvement especially during the interwar years. In 1930 there were only 252 Luxembourgers living in the Congo, but by 1960 there were around 600, including women and children. Despite the positions Luxembourgers held in the Belgian Congo, settlers never made more than 1.5% of the total White population. After independence, around 155, mostly missionaries and nuns, remained in the Congo.

=== Swiss ===
Leopold II sought neutral nationals, such as the Swiss and American, as a means to reinforce the image of his "civilizing mission" in the Congo. Leopold II recruited Gustave Moynier to lead his African project and consulted him extensively, making him an influential figure in the development of the Congo Free State. Moynier founded the Swiss colonial journal, "L'Afrique explored et civilisée" (Explored and Civilized Africa )" which detailed exploration and European colonization in Africa.

Swiss agents of the Congo Free State primarily recruited from French-speaking Switzerland through the Belgian consul in Neuchâtel. During this time Swiss nationals made up the fourth largest community of Europeans with around 200 Swiss contractors serving in the administration of King Leopold II. Approximately 25% of them died. Towards the end of the Belgian Congo there was 1,215 Swiss in 1959 and by 1962 there was 760. As of 2024 there was 165 Swiss nationals in the DRC.

=== Scandinavians ===
The presence of Scandinavians in the Congo dates back to the 1880s. Between the 1880s and 1930s, it's estimated that between 1,000 to 2,000 Danes, Finns, Norwegians, and Swedes were recruited for the colonization of the Congo. People from Nordic countries formed the third largest group of employees in the Congo Free State. They took part in a variety of roles - officers, sailors, engineers, travelers, and missionaries. Between 1886 and 1908, the Force Publique's officer core consisted of 53 Danes, 47 Swedes, and 26 Norwegians. At one point Swedish soldiers formed the thirdest largest nationality in the Force Publique. There was around 200 Finns who were particularly recruited to work on riverboats. The exact number is not fully known because Finns were sometimes listed as Swedes.

=== Mixed-Race Congolese ===
Included in the White population were "Recognized Eurafricans." Intermarriage was never prohibited in the Belgian Congo and children of mixed parentage could receive European legal status if they were recognized by a father who also had European legal status. "Non-recognized Eurafrican" children could be recognized as European if adopted by a European family. In 1959 there was 437 "Recognized" children and 115 "Non-recognized" children enrolled in state primary schools across the Congo.

=== Americans ===
Most White Americans in the Congo were Protestant missionaries. There were multi-generational families of American missionaries that worked and resided in the Congo until the mid 1960s. In addition some notable missionaries were African Americans, such as George Washington Williams and William Henry Sheppard. Sheppard and another American missionary, Samuel N. Lapsley, founded the first American Presbyterian mission in 1890 at Luebo. After Lapsley had passed away, Sheppard ran the mission alone until more American missionaries arrived 1893 and again in 1896. William M. Morrison arrived in 1897, and together with Sheppard documented and spoke out against the abuses faced by Africans at the hands of King Leopold's Free State government. They wound up being sued by the government-controlled Kasai Rubber Company for libel. Their trial brought international attention to the Free State and their acquittal would lead to land reforms that would eventually end the Congo Free State.

=== Greeks ===
See: Greeks in the Democratic Republic of the Congo

=== Jews ===
See: History of the Jews in the Democratic Republic of the Congo

== Language ==
French was the de facto official language of the Belgian Congo with about 73% of White Congolese using French as their main language. 23% were Flemish or Dutch speakers and 4% spoke other languages. Most White Congolese that learned and spoke African languages were missionaries, though there are testimonials of White children raised in the Congo that grew up speaking up these languages natively.

=== Dutch in the Belgian Congo ===
The arrival of Fleming officers, agents, and missionaries through the late 1870s and 1880s was the beginning structural presence of Dutch in Central Africa. Though Dutch speakers formed a majority in Belgium at the time and a large portion of early settlers were Flemings, French had been the primary language of administration and the Belgian elite and as such was in the Belgian Congo. Flemings in the Congo used Dutch informally or privately, but when communicating with locals they used either French or indigenous languages. Dutch had been seen as a lower language and at the time Flanders was impoverished, and since the colonial administration initially pursued a policy that didn't allow for the immigration of poor whites, Dutch never saw true official usage in the Belgian Congo.

The Colonial Charter of 1908 did stipulate that French and Flemish would have equal grounding in the Congo and that the linguistic rights of the Flemings would be granted as in Belgium. Prior to 1936, the Colonial Schools of Belgium had only instructed future settlers in French. Edmond Rubbens, the Minister of the Colonies, pushed for bilingual education and administration in the Belgian Congo and in October 1936, he managed to have a Dutch-speaking department opened in the Colonial Schools. There was even at a time a proposal for the Belgian Congo to be divided into Flemish and French-speaking provinces, largely pushed by the far-right, Vlaamsch Nationaal Verbond.

Prior to 1957, Francophone law specialists argued that the charter only applied to private language usage and because there was no decrees regarding official communication, the continuation of French in administration was inherited from the previous administration prior to 1908. As the number of Flemings grew in the Congo during the 1940s, there was growing resentment that the colonial government had not followed through with the charter. This started in 1939 when Flemish civil servants had their rights recognized to use Dutch in official correspondences. White children in the Congo only learned French and it wasn't until 1948 that the White schools starting implementing separate French and Dutch-speaking sections. Dutch education was limited though and by 1956 only 24 of the 43 primary schools for whites and 8 of the 25 secondary schools had Dutch classes.

In 1952, a judge, Jozef Grootaert, conducted a trial and sentencing in Elisabethville, entirely in Dutch. Grootaert was a major proponent for the officialization of Dutch in the colonies and his case caused a controversy that resulted in a legal battle that lasted between 1952 and 1956, and was ultimately settled by a 1957 decree that allowed for Flemings to be heard and tried in Dutch in colonial courts. This was the only linguistic-related decree ever made in the colony. Between 1957 and 1958, there were attempts to create a similar decree to allow Dutch in administration and even discussion to bilingualize the University of Elisabethville, but the rise of native nationalism and independence in 1960, ended any such movements.

The introduction of Dutch was not only unpopular with the French-speaking Whites, but with the native Congolese as well. They didn't have a say in the matter except for being able to advise what languages to use in education at the provincial level. Of the six provinces of Belgian Congo, only Katanga allowed for a choice between French and Dutch, while the others chose to make French the sole language of education. After independence, bilingualism was largely abandoned by the Congolese and, in 1961, the new government ordered that all Dutch documents and signs be removed and replaced with French ones.

Flemish speakers were specifically targeted during the Congo Crisis.

== Religion ==
Over three-quarters of White Congolese were Catholic. White Protestants in the Congo primarily came from Scandinavian, American or British backgrounds and belonged to a variety of Evangelical denominations.

== Notable people ==
- Pierre Ubaldo Ferrari, former CEO of Heifer International (2010-2022), born in Elizabethville in 1950, the son of Italian and Belgian settlers
- Georges Van der Kerken, colonial administrator in the Belgian Congo and professor of colonial economics and law
- Jeanne Rogissart, wife of Van der Kerken, one of the heads of the Union of Colonial Women, which provided education for European women moving to or residing in Africa
- Gerard Cravatte, mining director for Forminière, president of MIBA, and financier of the secession of South Kasai
- Jacques Leurs, born in Ilambi in 1910 to a Luxembourgish rubber factory worker and a Congolese woman, considered the first Black Luxembourger
- Nicolas Grang, first European buried in the Cimetiere des Pionniers in Léopoldville

== See also ==
- Belgian Congo – 1908–1960 Belgian colony in Central Africa
- Congo Crisis
- Invasion of South Kasai
- Operation Dragon Rouge
- White Africans of European ancestry
- Pieds-noirs
- History of the Jews in the Democratic Republic of the Congo
- Ech war am Congo - documentary about Luxembourgers in the Congo
