= Camille Van den Plas =

Belgian soldier, accountant and colonial administrator

Camille Théodore Joseph Van den Plas
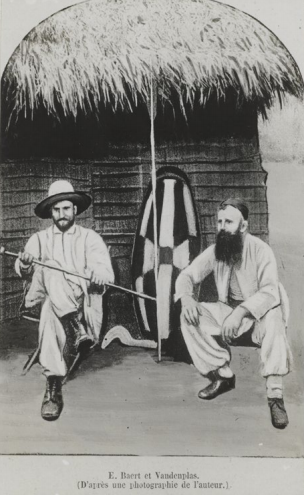
- Ernest Baert and Camille Van den Plas from Camille Coquilhat, Sur le Haut Congo 1882- 1886, Paris, 1888
- Born: 5 January 1850; Saint-Josse-ten-Noode, Belgium
- Died: 15 March 1902 (aged 52); Brussels, Belgium
- Occupations: Soldier, accountant, colonial administrator

Camille Théodore Joseph Van den Plas (5 January 1850 – 15 March 1902) was a Belgian soldier, accountant and colonial administrator. He was active in establishing the intendancy in Congo Free State.

== Early years (1850–1884) ==
Camille Théodore Joseph Van den Plas was born in Saint-Josse-ten-Noode, Brussels, Belgium on 5 January 1850. His parents were Pierre Joseph Van den Plas, a teacher at the Brussels Athénée, and Anne-Marie Holzemer. He studied at the Middle School of Saint-Josse-ten-Noode. Where he learned to speak and write French, Flemish, English and German. In 1865 he enlisted as a volunteer with the 8th Line Regiment. He was appointed sergeant in 1867 and sergeant major on 21 December 1868. On 31 December 1874 he left the army and then held several jobs as an accountant.

== First term in the Congo (1884–1887) ==
On 1 April 1884 Van den Plas was hired as an agent by the International Association of the Congo. He left Liverpool on the Roquette on 17 April 1884, bound for the Congo. He spent several months at Vivi, then on 31 July 1884, was appointed first commercial agent in Léopoldville.

On 11 November 1884 Guillaume Casman left for Équateur in an expedition with three steamers: the Royal, A.I.A. and En Avant. The members included Charles Liebrechts and Van den Plas. They arrived at Equateur Station on 12 December 1884, where Alphonse van Gèle handed over command to Casman in a ceremony before the native chiefs. Van Gèle then left for a visit to the Stanley Falls accompanied by Van den Plas and the Swedish lieutenant Edde Gleerup. The mission reached the Falls on 26 January 1885, where they found a very precarious situation due to the actions of the Zanzibar Arab trader Tippu Tip. They managed to get Tuppu Tip to agree not to interfere with the Belgians, but he did not keep this promise.

Van Gèle charged Van den Plas with establishing an accounting service in the Upper Congo. On 1 July 1885 Van den Plas was appointed head of Equateur station. He replaced Casman, and in December 1885 was replaced by Edward James Glave. On 28 December 1885 he was appointed commercial agent among the Bangalas. He was then responsible for leading a first contingent of 84 Bangala soldiers, with 11 women to Boma. He was responsible for training them under the orders of Lieutenant Léon Roget. In December 1886, as assistant to Lieutenant Henri Avaert, he took part in the expedition to Manyanga and was responsible for the evacuation of Vivi. He returned to Boma on 14 January 1887, embarked at Banana on 17 January 1887 and reached Belgium on 15 February 1887 at the end of his term of service.

== Subsequent terms (1887–1901) ==
Van den Plas signed a new three-year engagement and left Belgium of 21 August 1887, reaching Boma on 28 September 1887. He started work as an administrative agent of the Congo Free State. On 9 January 1888, he was named director of the general supply depot in Boma, and on 28 September 1888 was appointed commander of Boma station. On 27 October 1888, he was promoted to district commissioner 2nd class. On 10 June 1890 he was appointed deputy secretary general. After completing his term, he returned to Belgium on 19 September 1890.

On 18 March 1891 Van den Plas was appointed intendant. He arrived in Boma on 15 April 1891, where he organized and led the intendancy until leaving from Banana on 24 September 1893. He signed up for another three-year engagement, reached Boma on 30 July 1894 and resumed his duties on 1 August 1894. He carried out multiple audits and inspections during this term. Governor General Théophile Wahis took him as deputy on his inspection tour to Kasongo.

Van den Plas returned to Boma on 25 February 1897 and left for Belgium on 5 April 1897. He returned on a special mission in the Congo from 2 July 1898 to 26 June 1899. He was sent on another special mission, arrived in Boma on 21 September 1901, but fell sick and suffered from severe ophthalmia. He reembarked on the same ship on 11 October 1901, and died in Brussels on 15 March 1902.

== Sources ==
- Coosemans, M. (21 May 1948), "CASMAN (Guillaume-Camille)" (PDF), Biographie Belge d'Outre-Mer (in French), vol. II, Académie Royale des Sciences d'Outre-Mer, pp. 143–147
- Engels, A. (1951), "Vangele (Alphonse)" (PDF), Biographie Coloniale Belge, vol. 2, Institut royal colonial belge, pp. 928–37
- Omasombo Tshonda, Jean, ed. (2016), Équateur : Au cœur de la cuvette congolaise (PDF), Musée royal de l’Afrique centrale, ISBN 978-9-4922-4423-9
- Pardoen, A. (15 July 1947), "PLAS (VAN DEN) (Camille - ThéodoreJoseph)", Biographie Coloniale Belge (in French), vol. I, Inst. roy. colon. belge, pp. col. 758-760
