= Kimpoko =

- Location within Democratic Republic of the Congo
- Coordinates: 4.185552°S 15.549483°E
- Country: Democratic Republic of the Congo
- Province: Kinshasa
- Elevation: 295 m (968 ft)

Kimpoko is a district within Maluku municipality in the Democratic Republic of the Congo.

== Location ==
Kimpoko is on the northeast shore of the Pool Malebo near where a branch of the Congo River enters the Pool to east of the Îles de Kabongo. It is in Kinshasa Province, about 30 kilometres (19 mi) as the crow flies to the northeast of the capital city of Kinshasa.

== History ==
In June 1883 Louis-Gustave Amelot was appointed commander of Kimpoko station. At Kimpoko Amelot got into an argument with a chief and six of his headmen over the rotting carcass of a hippopotamus, which resulted in their being killed. Soon there were rumors that the post was in danger, and Henry Morton Stanley ordered the complete evacuation of its staff and equipment to Léopoldville. In 1884 Edde Gleerup was appointed head of the Kimpoko Station at Stanley Pool. He built a new station there.

A Baptist missionary station was established at Kimpoko in 1886 as a way-station for transportation to the Upper Kasaï region. The missionaries also had stations at Vivi, Isangila and Manyanga. From the 88 miles (142 km) stretch of the river from Isangila to Manyanga they could travel by a launch propelled by oars and sails. From there they had to walk 100 miles (160 km) to Léopoldville, and from there by oars of steamer 20 miles (32 km) to Kimpoko.

== Sources ==
- Boyd, James P. (2019-12-03), Stanley in Africa: The Wonderful Discoveries and Thrilling Adventures of the Great African Explorer, and Other Travelers, Pioneers and Missionaries, Good Press
- Engels, A. (31 July 1947), "AMELOT (Louis-Gustave)", Biographie Coloniale Belge (in French), vol. I, Inst. roy. colon. belge, pp. 22–24
- Hofberg, Herman; Heurlin, Frithiof; Millqvist, Viktor; Rubenson, Olof (1906), "Gleerup, Sten Edvard (Edde)", Svenskt biografiskt handlexikon
- Jeal, Tim (2011-10-06), Stanley: Africa's Greatest Explorer, Faber & Faber, ISBN 978-0-571-26564-0
- "Node: Kimpoko (616873180)", OpenStreetMap
