= George Grenfell =

Baptist missionary to Cameroon and explorer of Africa

- Missionary and explorer in Africa
- Born: 21 August 1849; Sancreed, Cornwall, England, United Kingdom
- Died: 1 July 1906 (aged 56); Basoko, Congo Free State
- Spouse(s): Mary Hawkes (1877†); Rosana Patience Edgerley (1855–1928)
- Children: Seven children: Patience Elizabeth Grenfell, Caroline Mary Grenfell, Unknown child, Dorothy Grenfell, Gertrude Grenfell, Unknown child, Grace Isabel Grenfell Quallo

George Grenfell (21 August 1849, in Sancreed, Cornwall – 1 July 1906, in Basoko, Congo Free State (now the Democratic Republic of the Congo) was an English missionary and explorer.

== Early years ==
Grenfell was born at Sancreed, near Penzance, Cornwall. After the family moved to Birmingham he was educated at a branch of King Edward's school. Though his parents were Anglicans he soon joined Heneage Street Baptist Chapel, where he was admitted to membership by baptism on 7 Nov. 1864. He founded the Birmingham Young Men’s Baptist Missionary Society.

After leaving school, he was apprenticed to a firm of hardware and machinery merchants. Influenced by the likes of David Livingstone, Grenfell's ambition was to become a missionary so in September 1873 he entered the Baptist College, Stokes Croft, Bristol. On 10 Nov. 1874 the Baptist Missionary Society accepted him for work in Africa.

In December 1874, he went as a Baptist missionary to Cameroon, West Africa, with Alfred Saker (1814–80).

He married Mary Hawkes from Heneage Street Baptist Chapel but she died in January 1877; the following year he married his housekeeper Rose Edgerley and they had a daughter named Patience.

In 1877 he relocated to Victoria and explored the Wouri River and in the following year he ascended Mongo ma Loba Mountain. From 1880 onwards he did some important work in exploring little-known rivers of the Congo Basin.

== Congo explorations ==
In 1881, cooperating with the Rev Thomas J. Comber and others, he established a chain of missions at Musuko, Vivi, Isangila, Manyanga, and other points, and in 1884, in a small steam vessel, he explored the Congo to the equator. He established headquarters at Arthington, near Leopoldville, in 1884, and launched on Stanley Pool a river steam vessel, the Peace, in which he explored the Kivu, the Kwango, and the Kasai rivers, discovered the Ruki, or Black River, and ascended the Mubangi for 200 miles (320 km) to Grenfell Falls, at lat. 4° 40' N. In 1885 he explored with Curt von François other tributaries of the Congo, notably the Busira, along which he found Pygmy Batwa peoples. In the following year he examined the Kasai, the Sankuru, and the Luebo and Lulua, and made careful records of the Bakuba and Bakete tribes. He was awarded in 1887 the Founder’s Medal of the Royal Geographical Society for his explorations in the Cameroons and Congo. In four years he had charted 3,400 miles (5,550km) of waterways. In total, the Peace travelled 15,000 miles (over 24,000km).

By 1888, he had buried four children, as well as Comber’s wife.

In 1891 he was appointed a plenipotentiary for Belgium to delimit the boundary line between the Belgian and Portuguese possessions along the Luanda frontier. He was awarded the Medal of the Order of the Lion of Africa by King Leopold II. In 1903 he protested to King Leopold against consistent refusal of the Congo Free State authorities to countenance further Baptist advance beyond Yakusu on the Upper Congo, but with no effect. From 1893 to 1900 Grenfell remained chiefly at Bolobo on the Congo, where a strong mission station was established. After a visit to England in 1900, he started for a systematic exploration of the Aruwimi River and by November 1902 had reached Mawambi, about eighty miles from the western extreme of the Protectorate of Uganda.

== Last years ==
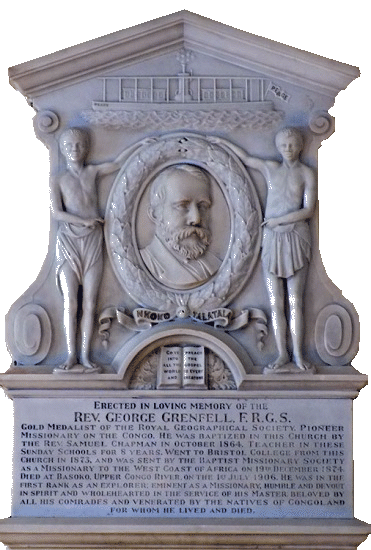
The Memorial originally erected in Heneage Street Baptist Chapel on 24 September 1907. Now in Grenfell Baptist Church, Ward End, Birmingham

Between 1903 and 1906 Grenfell was busy with a new station at Yalemba, fifteen miles east of the confluence of the Aruwimi with the Congo. Meanwhile, he found difficulty in obtaining building sites from the Congo Free State, which accorded them freely to Roman Catholics. He grew convinced of Catholic favouritism in the Belgian administration, which he had previously trusted. In 1903 King Leopold despatched at Grenfell's entreaty a commission of inquiry, before which he gave evidence, but its report gave him little satisfaction. In 1904, Grenfell resigned from the Commission for the Protection of the Natives. He died after a bad attack of blackwater fever at Basoko on 1 July 1906.

A memorial tablet was unveiled in Heneage Street Baptist Chapel, Birmingham, on 24 September 1907. During major 1950s clearance of the area for redevelopment Heneage Street Baptist was closed. The tablet was recovered and was moved to a new Chapel in north-east Birmingham named in his honour.

His papers are held at the Angus Library and Archive at Oxford.

== Publications ==
- Life on the Congo, by William Holman Bentley; with an introduction by George Grenfell. London: The Religious Tract Society, 1887.
- The upper Congo, Geographical Journal, Bd. 20 (1902)
- Exploration of the Tributaries of the Congo, between Leopoldville and Stanley Falls, published in Proceedings of the Royal Geographical Society and Monthly Record of Geography, vol. 8, no. 10, Royal Geographical Society (with the Institute of British Geographers), Wiley, 1886, pp. 627-34
- The Cameroon District, West Africa, Royal Geographical Society, London, 1882
