= Arvid Wester =

Swedish soldier (1856–1914)

Arvid Mauritz Wester
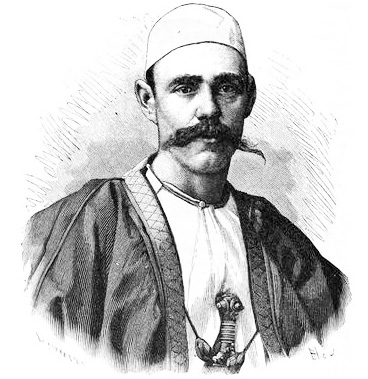
- Wester in Arab dress circa 1885
- Born: 10 June 1856; Karlskoga parish, Örebro County, Sweden
- Died: 11 July 1914 (aged 58); Stockholm, Sweden
- Occupations: Soldier, colonial administrator

Arvid Mauritz Wester (10 June 1856 – 11 July 1914) was a Swedish soldier who was active in the service of the Belgians in the Congo. For almost two years he commanded the remote station at Stanley Falls, where he had to deal with hostile local people and Arabs.

== Early years (1856–1883) ==
Arvid Mauritz Wester was born on 10 June 1856 in Karlskoga, Örebro County, Sweden. He was descended from the younger son of Peder Wester. He joined the army as a volunteer on 1 May 1874. On 14 July 1877 he enrolled as a cadet at the Military School. He was appointed second lieutenant in the 21st infantry regiment (Närkes regiment) on 2 December 1878. He decided to take service with the new International African Association (AIA).

== Congo (1883–1886) ==
Wester and about ten other Swedish officers were hired by King Leopold II of Belgium to help found the Congo Free State. Wester was admitted as an assistant on 1 November 1883, and left for the Congo on 14 November 1883. He arrived in Vivi on 5 January 1884 and reached Léopoldville on 5 February 1884. Captain Edmond Hanssens headed upstream from Léopoldville on 23 March 1884 with the three steamers and six Europeans: Wester, Louis-Gustave Amelot, Frederick Drees, Auguste-Joseph Guérin, Ernest Courtois and Nicholls.

Wester and Courtois took the lead on the Royal, with the engineer Guérin, but the steamer hit a rock and was holed. They made hasty repairs and caught up with the flotilla downstream from Kinshasa. However, a mechanical problem developed that took a long time to repair, and a tornado broke out. They did not rejoin the flotilla until 26 March 1884 at noon. The expedition reached Équateurville on 17 April 1884. Wester and Courtois remained there while Hanssens and Alphonse van Gèle explored the lower Ubangi River and the Mongala River. On 4 June Wester rejoined Hanssens' column, which reached the Itimbiri and ascended that river for 75 kilometres (47 mi). Courtois fell ill there and died on 26 June 1884.

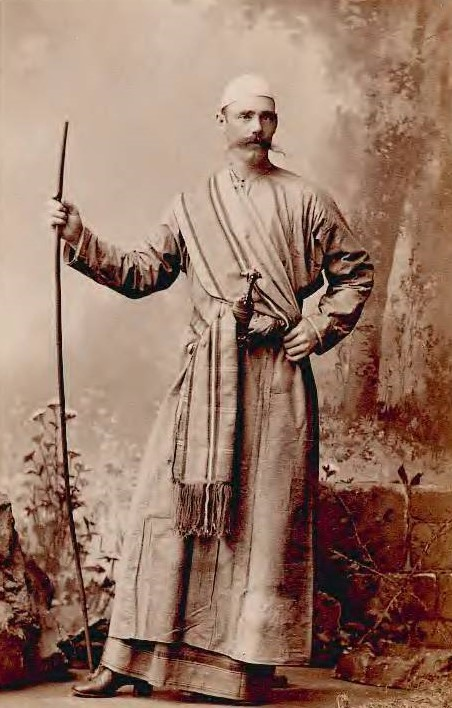
Wester circa 1885

The expedition arrived at the Falls on 3 July 1884. Hanssens relieved Adrian Binnie, who had commanded there since Henry Morton Stanley's visit in December 1883, and would return to the coast. He replaced him by Wester, with Amelot as deputy. On 11 July 1884 Hanssens left the Falls. Wester had only 20 Hausa soldiers, and at first had to fight serious battles against the local people before gaining their esteem and trust. He also had to contend with the Arabs led by Tippu Tip, who wanted to take over the station. He signed a treaty of friendship with Tippo-Tip's son, Moini Amani, stipulating that the Arabs would not pass to the north of the station. However, within a month the Arabs had violated the agreement. Too weak to retaliate, Wester concentrated on improving his defenses.

Towards the end of 1884 Van Gèle made a visit to the Falls accompanied by the intendant Camille Van den Plas and the Swedish lieutenant Edde Gleerup. He left the Equateur post on 20 November 1884. Well before reaching the Aruwimi River he noticed that the local people had been terrorized by a recent attack by the Arabs against the Basokos. The supply expedition continued on to Stanley Falls. The land upstream from the Aruwimi had all been deserted by the people, who had fled the Arabs. Soon after the expedition reached the Falls, Tippo-Tip sent his nephew Rachid to greet Van Gèle. Later that day Tippo-Tip himself visited Van Gèle and assured him he wanted cordial relations with the Europeans and would stop hunting for slaves. Van Gèle thought it was better to try to use Arab power to help the Belgians get established, as did Hanssens and Coquilhat.

Van Gèle left Lieutenant Gleerup at the Falls to assist Wester. After the end of his term of service, Gleerup accepted an offer to travel east to Zanzibar under the protection of Tippu Tip. He left the station at the end of 1885 and reached Zanzibar at the end of June 1886. Gleerup thus became the eighth European and first Swede to cross Africa. Wester had fallen ill and was due to go on leave. Lieutenant Walter Deane was assigned to replace him, set out on the Stanley with forty Bangala soldiers and arrived at the Falls on 14 February 1886. Wester handed over command of the post to Deane and left on 21 February 1886. Wester arrived in Leopoldville on 26 March 1886 and in Banana on 23 April 1886. He returned to Europe on 10 June 1886.

After Wester's departure, the situation worsened. Tippo-Tip returned to Zanzibar and was replaced by his nephew Rachid, an irreconcilable enemy of the Europeans. The Stanley Falls station was attacked by the Arabs in September 1886 and completely destroyed.

== Later career (1886–1914) ==
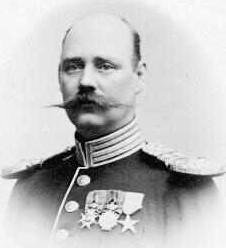
Arvid Mauritz Wester

Wester became a lieutenant in Närke's regiment in 1885. In 1905 he was appointed major in the Life Regiment's grenadiers, from where he was transferred in 1907 to the Gotland Infantry Regiment. He left the army in 1912. Wester died on 11 July 1914 in Stockholm, Sweden.

== Sources ==
- Boelaert, E. (1952), "Equateurville", Aequatoria (in French), 15e Année (1), Honoré Vinck: 1–12, JSTOR 25838164
- Coosemans, M. (1 February 1949), "Wester (Arvid-Mauritz)", Biographie Coloniale Belge, vol. II, Inst. roy. colon. belge, pp. col. 975–977
- Engels, A. (23 December 1946), "Hanssens (Edmond-Winnie-Victor)", Biographie Coloniale Belge, vol. I, Inst. roy. colon. belge, pp. col. 479–493
- Engels, A. (1951), "Vangele (Alphonse)" (PDF), Biographie Coloniale Belge, vol. 2, Institut royal colonial belge, pp. 928–37
- Hofberg, Herman; Heurlin, Frithiof; Millqvist, Viktor; Rubenson, Olof (1906), "Gleerup, Sten Edvard (Edde)", Svenskt biografiskt handlexikon
- Janssens, Édouard; Cateaux, Albert (1908), Les Belges au Congo: notices biographiques, Antwerp: J. van Hille-De Backer, pp. 167–182
- "Wester, 2. Arvid Maurits", Nordisk familjebok (2 ed.), 1921 – via Project Runeberg
