= Yanzi people =

Ethnic group in the Democratic Republic of the Congo

BaYanzi
Regions with significant populations
- Democratic Republic of the Congo

Languages
- Yansi language, Kituba

Yanzi
- Person: Muyanzi
- People: Bayanzi
- Language: Kiyanzi

The Bayanzi (or Yan, Yanzi, Yansi people) are an ethnic group in the Democratic Republic of the Congo who live in the southwest of the country and number about seven million.

The Yanzi speak Kiyansi (or Eyans), a language in the Bantu language family. The largest political unit is the chieftainship, of which there are about 120 under 3 traditional kings of which the most prominent is the Kinkie or Binkie King whose latest figurehead was Mfum' ngol' or Mfumu ngolo as pronounced by Europeans (translated as "the great or strong king") from Kidzweme territory, and recently his successor Mfum' Ntwàl Moka Ngol' Mpat', a Harvard-trained economist.

The Bayanzi are matrilineal, so a child belongs to the clan of the mother.

The Belgian colonial travelers first encountered them at Bolobo on the Congo River, as traders up and down the river. They employed them from 1883, primarily as bodyguards. Later, the Bayanzi were forced to labor on the palm oil plantations and later used as clerks or translators.

== Ethnicity ==
The Bayanzi are a people of the southwest Democratic Republic of the Congo who speak a Bantu language. Other names include Batende, Bayansi, Mbiem, Nkaan, Wachanzi, Yansi, Yanzi, Yey.

== Territory ==
River mouths and towns in the Congo

The Jesuits recorded local traditions of the Bayansi, which seem to show that they originated from a mix of mainly the North (present Sudan) or Northwest (present Gabon) by mix marriages of tribal chiefs, in a region they called "Kimput" which means "Europa" and seems to refer to Egypt (Hut-Ka-Ptah) or Ethiopia "Punt". They talked of a great river whose waters were salty and which even large sailboats were unable to cross. Perhaps this refers to the Atlantic Ocean or the Nile river or even both. They say that they lived in semi-slavery in the land of Kong Mukoko, and then became traders at the edge of the Pool Malebo.

As of 1908 the Bayanzi ranged from the lower Kasai River to the main Congo River and the Ubangi River confluence. As of 1967 their population was about 200,000 in their own territory, which covered about 25,000 square kilometres (9,700 sq mi). This is the Lower Kwilu River between the mouth of the Kwenge River and the Kwango River. To the north it extends along the left bank of the Kasai River between 15°E and 17°E. To the south it extends along both banks of the Inzia River and Lukula River. It included 60 chieftainships in Bandundu Territory, 30 in the Kikwit area and 30 in Masi-Manimba Territory. In 1960 the Bayanzi demanded creation of a North Kwilu Province.

== Social structure ==
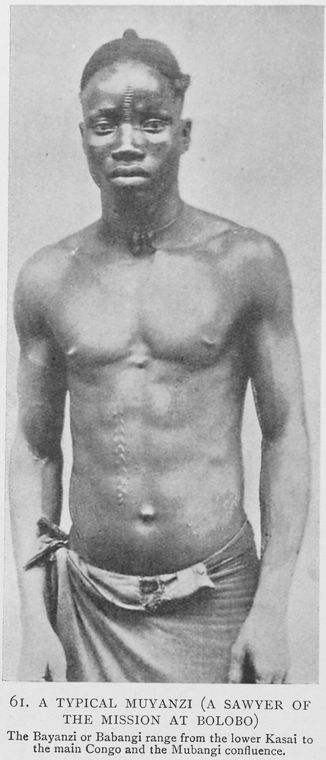
A Bayanzi sawyer of the Bolobo mission, Congo Free State, 1908

The Bayanzi had a king and a central government. Their political organization is based on the chieftainship, which has well-defined borders within which the male clan are the aristocrats and produce the chiefs, and the female clan are free individuals who provide wives to the aristocrats. Within the chieftainship the village is the primary unit. Traditionally each village had an upstream district for the elders and downstream district for young families. Adolescents of each sex lived in dormitories. Each clan has their own field, and some parts of the forest were reserved for use by one clan.

The Bayansi are matrilineal, considering that the child is formed from the blood of the mother and belongs to the mother's clan. However, the father is responsible for finding wives from outside the clan for his children. Grandparents are thought to be reincarnated in their grandchildren, whether dead or still living.

== Colonial contacts ==
On 30 October 1882 Edmond Hanssens reached Bolobo on the Congo River, where he negotiated for ten days with Kuka, King of the Bayanzi, who then signed a treaty that placed his lands and people under the protection of the International African Association. Hanssens' crews at once began to build a station. Hanssens sent the Eclaireur back to Léopoldville to collect supplies and to bring back Lieutenant Orban to take command of the new station. Hanssens made treaties with the Congolese people at the mouth of the Kasai and acquired land for the Kwamouth post.

At the end of August 1883 Charles Liebrechts visited Kwamouth on the way up the Congo River to help Êmile Brunfaut in Bolobo station in Bayanzi country, which had been burned down. In November 1883 Liebrechts returned seeking reinforcements and ammunition after Bolobo had been burned again. On 18 January 1884, soon after the third fire at Bolobo, Henry Morton Stanley arrived on his way down from the Stanley Falls. Hanssens returned to Bolobo on 3 April 1884, where lieutenant Charles Liebrechts had now formed a good relationship with the Bayanzi. They continued upstream, founded the N'Gandu post and made treaties with the chiefs along the river.

Attilio Pécile, who was associated for three years with Giacomo di Brazzà in his exploration of the region north of the Congo, wrote in 1887 that the Bakales, Fans, and Bayanzi were all still pagans, and mostly cannibals. He said, "The Bayanzi, who have acquired the ascendency along the right bank of the Lower Congo, seem to have come originally from the same regions as the Fans, whom they resemble in physical appearance, character, language, and usages. But while the latter are "land-lubbers," displaying absolute horror of the water, the Bayanzi have always been great fluvial navigators, so that their original home may have been the Upper Ubangi, slowly advancing down this great artery to its junction with the Congo."

Alexandre Delcommune encountered a convoy of Bayanzi pirogues in March 1888. He wrote,

We see some canoes pass of the Bayanzi, who have a passion for trading and are the big ivory traffickers in this part of the state. They go by water to sell their products to the chiefs of Kinchassa and to this Ngaliema of whom Stanley has drawn such a vivid portrait. Their canoes, sometimes over fifteen meters long, are hardly more than eighty to ninety centimeters wide. The goods are piled up among brightly colored umbrellas. Spaces are kept between the lots for the rowers of both sexes who, numbering fifteen to twenty, paddled with ardor, to the rhythm of a monotonous song of a team leader, standing with a rooster between his feet, on a small platform at the back. They come from the Bolobo region, which is further ahead.

== Colonial exploitation ==
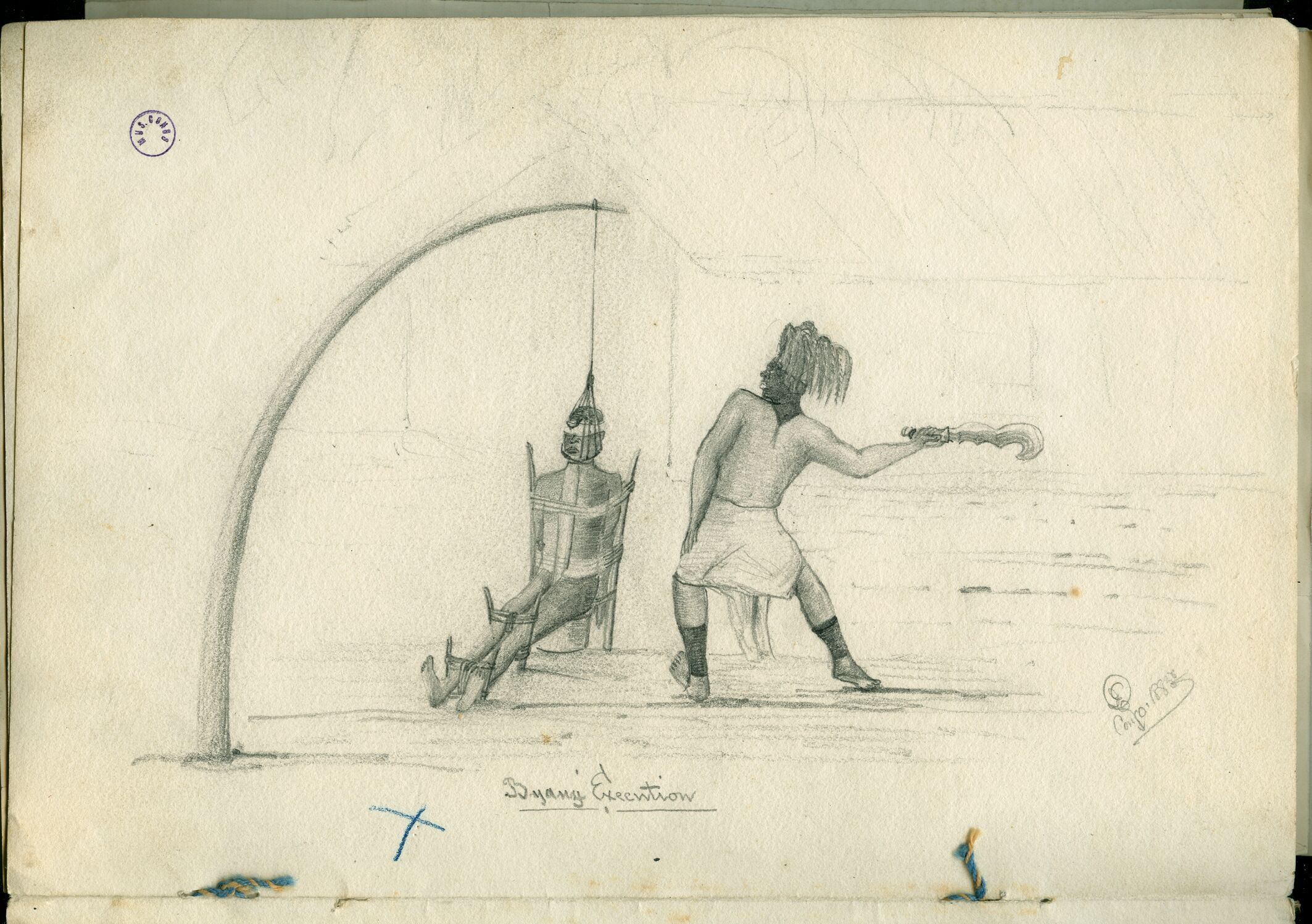
1885 illustration of a Bayanzi execution

The Bayanzi were the first indigenous peoples to be employed by the Europeans, which began around 1883. Because the Bayanzi and Bobangi spoke variants of the Bangala language, this became a lingua franca in the region. Probably they were free to work for the Belgians because the Bayanzi in turn employed many slaves. The Catholic missionary August Schynse used the Bayanzi for protection against the local people, traveling with five canoes and men armed with 25 guns. He wrote in 1889 of sleeping on the bamls of the Kasai "in the middle of my Bayanzi army."

Huileries du Congo Belge (HCB) was a subsidiary of the soap manufacturing company Lever Brothers, created in 1911 by William Hesketh Lever, which ran plantations in the Congo Basin for the production of palm oil, using forced labour. Reports by Rene Mouchet and Victor Daco show that some limited improvements were made to the condition of the HCB's workers by 1928 and 1929. However, the HCB was still using forced labour. Daco recommended that local workers should be fed just as imported workers were. Accommodations at many camps had been improved, and there were houses made of baked brick or adobe. However some camps, such as the villages of the Yanzi, were still in a deplorable state. Overcrowding continued to be an issue, as houses were too few in number, in Daco's opinion. Daco believed the existing hospitals were in good state, but that there were too few of them, and that the number of beds should be quadrupled.

== Post-independence ==
The Alliance des Bayanzi (ABAZI) was a party that represented the interests of the Bayanzi, formed in the late 1950s. At the Belgo-Congolese Round Table Conference in 1960 in Brussels on the future of the Belgian Congo and its institutional reforms the Alliance des Bayanzi was represented by Gaston Midu and his deputy Wenceslas Mbueny. In the 1960 Belgian Congo general election the Alliance des Bayanzi won 21,024 votes, or 0.95% of the total, and gained one seat in the chamber of deputies. After the independence of the Democratic Republic of the Congo in 1960, there were clashes with other Bakongo and the central government.

== Sources ==
- A typical Muyanzi [A Sawyer of the mission at Bolobo.], NYPL The New York Public Library
- Bayanzi, British Museum
- Engels, A. (23 December 1946), "HANSSENS (Edmond-Winnie-Victor)", Biographie Coloniale Belge, vol. I, Inst. roy. colon. belge, pp. col. 479–493
- "Geographical Notes", Nature, 36 (377): 377, 1887, Bibcode:1887Natur..36R.377., doi:10.1038/036377b0, S2CID 37169480
- "Iyansi", Ethnologue, SIL International
- Jadot, J. M. (22 December 1952), "PAGELS (Georges-Guillaume)", Biographie Coloniale Belge (in French), vol. IV, Inst. roy. colon. belge, pp. col. 671–673
- Malembe, Paul (21 December 1967), "Yansi Political Society", Translations on Sub-Saharan Africa (669), US Department of Commerce Joint Publications Research Service
- Marchal, Jules (2008), Lord Leverhulme's Ghosts: Colonial Exploitation in the Congo, translated by Martin Thom, First published as Travail forcé pour l'huile de palme de Lord Leverhulme: L'histoire du Congo 1910–1945, tome 3 by Editions Paula Bellings in 2001, London: Verso, ISBN 978-1-84467-239-4
- Mumbanza, mwa Bawele (1997), "La pirogue dans l'ouest du bassin du Congo au milieu du 19ème siècle. Contribution à l'histoire de la navigation en Afrique précoloniale", Annales Aequatoria (in French), 18, Honoré Vinck: 239–298, JSTOR 25837280
- Nohlen, D; Krennerich, M; Thibaut, B (1999), Elections in Africa: A data handbook, ISBN 0-19-829645-2
- Olson, James Stuart (1996), The Peoples of Africa: An Ethnohistorical Dictionary, Westport, Conn: Greenwood Press, ISBN 0-313-27918-7
- Samarin, William J. (June 1986), "Protestant Missions and the History of Lingala", Journal of Religion in Africa, 16 (Fasc. 2), Brill: 138–163, doi:10.2307/1581409, JSTOR 1581409
- The Belgo-Congolese Round Table: The historic days of February 1960. Brussels: C. Van Cortenbergh. 1960. OCLC 20742268.
- Yanzi (peuple d'Afrique), BnF Bibliotheque nationale de France
- Zeilig, Leo (2008), Lumumba: Africa's Lost Leader, London: Haus, ISBN 9781905791026
