= Edde Gleerup =

Swedish soldier and explorer

Sten Edvard (Edde) Gleerup
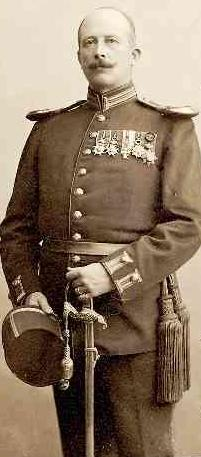
- Born: 13 June 1860; Chicago, United States
- Died: 1928
- Occupations: Soldier, explorer

Sten Edvard Gleerup, or Edde Gleerup, (13 June 1860 – 1928) was a Swedish soldier and explorer. He was the first Swede and eighth European to cross Africa.

== Life ==
Sten Edvard Gleerup was born on 13 June 1860 in Chicago. His father was Georg Josef Teodor Gleerup, a photographer in Chicago and then in Lund, and his mother was Wendela Sofia Hallström. In 1879 he was appointed a lieutenant in the Southern Scanian Infantry Regiment.

Gleerup joined the service of the Congo in 1883, and in 1884 was appointed head of the Kimpoko Station at Stanley Pool. He built a new station there. On 11 November 1884 Edmond Hanssens left Léopoldville in an expedition with three steamers: the Royal, A.I.A. and En Avant. The members included Guillaume Casman, Charles Liebrechts and Camille Van den Plas. They stopped at Kimpoko to embark Gleerup, who had been appointed second to Arvid Wester at the Falls. They arrived at Equateur Station, where Alphonse van Gèle handed over command to Casman in a ceremony before the native chiefs.

Van Gèle then left to visit the Falls accompanied by the intendant Van den Plas and Gleerup. He left the Equateur post on 20 November 1884. Well before reaching the Aruwimi River he noticed that the local people had been terrorized by a recent attack by the Arabs against the Basokos. The supply expedition continued on to Stanley Falls. The land upstream from the Aruwimi had all been deserted by the people, who had fled the Arabs. Soon after the expedition reached the Falls, Tippo-Tip sent his nephew Rachid to greet Van Gèle. Later that day Tippo-Tip himself visited Van Gèle and assured him he wanted cordial relations with the Europeans and would stop hunting for slaves.

Van Gèle left Lieutenant Gleerup at the Falls to support Lieutenant Wester. Wester, with Louis-Gustave Amelot as deputy, had arrived in July 1884. Wester and Gleerup were to oversee the outermost station and both the most important and the most dangerous. The Arab leader Tippu Tip did not want European interference in the region and demanded that the station be evacuated, but Wester managed to establish good relations with Tippu Tip, and the station developed.

After the end of his term of service, Gleerup accepted an offer to travel east to Zanzibar under the protection of the Arab chief. He left the station at the end of 1885 and reached Zanzibar at the end of June 1886. Gleerup thus became the eighth European and first Swede to cross Africa. Gleerup, Peter Möller and Georg Pagels published Three years in the Congo: in 1887–88. In 1888 he married Augusta Juliana (Julie) Malm. In 1896 he was promoted to captain.

== Publications ==
Möller, Peter; Gleerup Edv.; Pagels Georg (1887–1888), Tre år i Kongo: Skildringar (Three years in the Congo: Descriptions), Stockholm: P. A. Norstedt & S:r.

== Sources ==
- Coosemans, M. (21 May 1948), "CASMAN (Guillaume-Camille)" (PDF), Biographie Belge d'Outre-Mer (in French), vol. II, Académie Royale des Sciences d'Outre-Mer, pp. 143–147
- Engels, A. (23 December 1946), "HANSSENS (Edmond-Winnie-Victor)", Biographie Coloniale Belge, vol. I, Inst. roy. colon. belge, pp. col. 479–493
- Engels, A. (1951), "Vangele (Alphonse)" (PDF), Biographie Coloniale Belge, vol. 2, Institut royal colonial belge, pp. 928–37
- Hofberg, Herman; Heurlin, Frithiof; Millqvist, Viktor; Rubenson, Olof (1906), "Gleerup, Sten Edvard (Edde)", Svenskt biografiskt handlexikon
- Janssens, Édouard; Cateaux, Albert (1908), Les Belges au Congo: notices biographiques, Antwerp: J. van Hille-De Backer, pp. 167–182
