= Isangila =

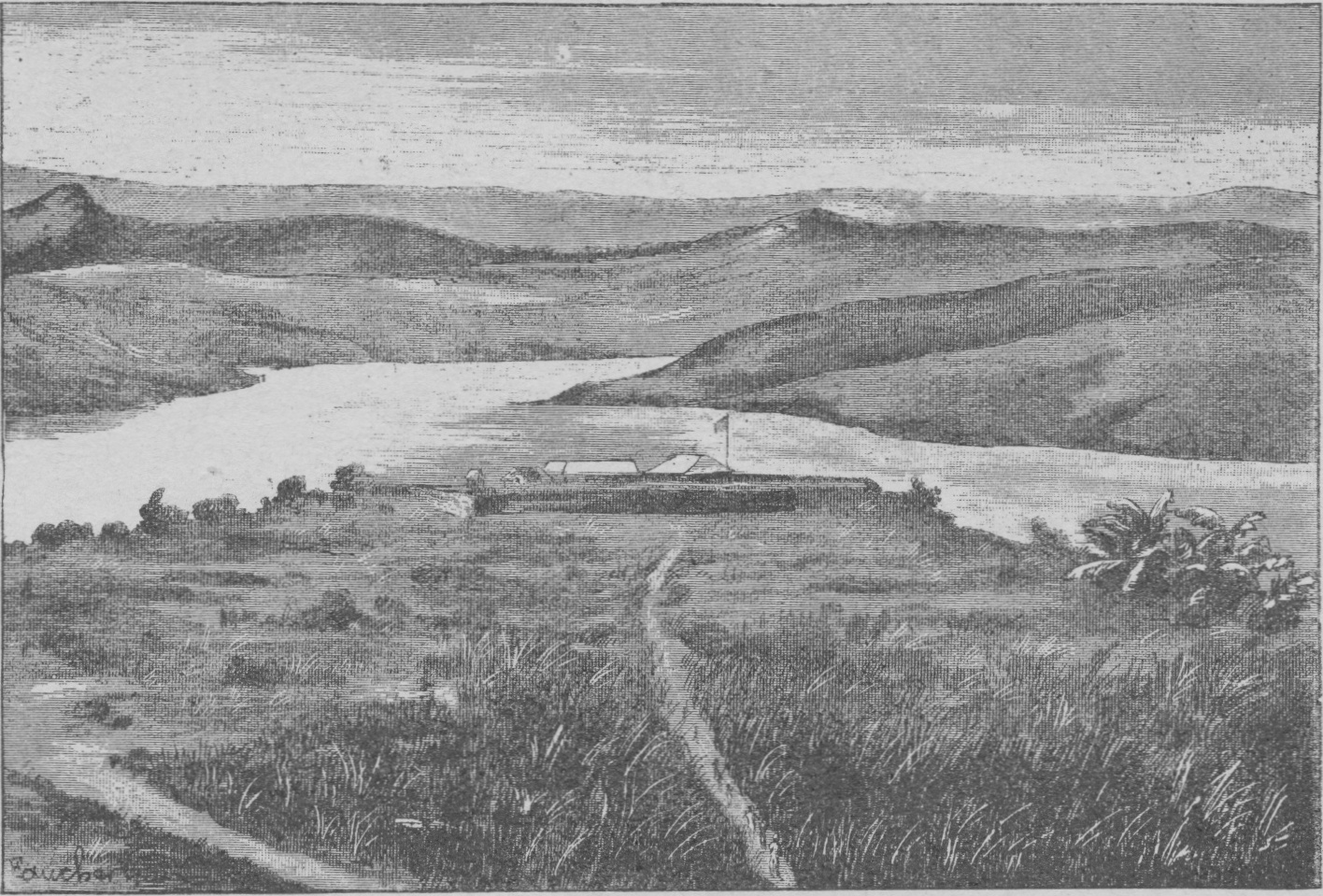
- Congo River by the station Isanghila 1890

- Location within Democratic Republic of the Congo
- Coordinates: 5.288210°S 13.600346°E
- Country: DR Congo
- Province: Kongo Central
- Territory: Seke-Banza
- Sector: Isangila

Isangila, formerly called Isanghila or Isanguila is the headquarters of a sector of the Seke-Banza territory in Kongo Central province of the Democratic Republic of the Congo.

== Location ==
The lower part of the Congo River below Stanley Pool first descends through the Livingstone Falls and rapids, then has a navigable section from Manyanga to Isangile, and then has further rapids and cataracts down to Matadi, from where it is navigable to the Atlantic Ocean. Isangila is on the right bank of the Congo River, about 52 kilometres (32 mi) north and upstream from Vivi. From there the river is navigable for small steamers and whaleboats for about 90 miles (140 km) upstream to Manyanga. It was an important post for portage operations to Léopoldville before the construction of the Matadi-Léopoldville Railway.

== History ==
In 1880 Henry Morton Stanley established stations for the International African Association at Vivi, Isanghila, Lukungo, Manyanga South and Leopoldville below Stanley Pool. Stanley returned to Vivi on 4 July 1882 and began organizing an expedition up the Congo River to the Stanley Falls, which would take control of the country along the route. When Louis Valcke and Alphonse van Gèle arrived in Vivi with a contingent of Zanzibari troops soon after, Stanley at once instructed them to work on construction of the road from Vivi to Isangila, bypassing the rapids and leading to the navigable section up to Manyanga, then to connect Manyanga to Léopoldville. The work had to be done quickly so the dismantled Association internationale Africaine steamer and goods could be carried to Léopoldville for the planned expedition.

The road to Isangila is mentioned by William Holman Bentley in his account of the Baptist Missionary Society, which came to the lower Congo in 1878. The African traders refused to let them travel up to Stanley Pool, for fear that they would bypass them and destroy the trade. Eventually they heard of Stanley's new steamer-road, which they found to extend about 50 miles (80 km) from Vivi along the north bank up to Isangila. From there they managed to travel quickly and unobtrusively up to the Pool. The Baptist missionary George Grenfell established a chain of missions at Musuko, Isangila and Manyanga.

== Sources ==
- Bentley, W. Holman, Reverend (1886), Dictionary and Grammar of the Kongo Language (PDF), London: Baptist Missionary Society
- Engels, A. (1951), "Vangele (Alphonse)" (PDF), Biographie Coloniale Belge, vol. 2, Institut royal colonial belge, pp. 928–37
- "Congo Free State - Stations - 1885", Global Security
- Hawker, George (1909), The Life of George Grenfell (PDF), London: The Religious Tract Society
- Kucher, Walter (1962–1963), Belgien und der Kongo (PDF), Abhandlungen der Naturhistorischen Gesellschaft Nürnberg (in German), vol. XXXI
