= Manyanga =

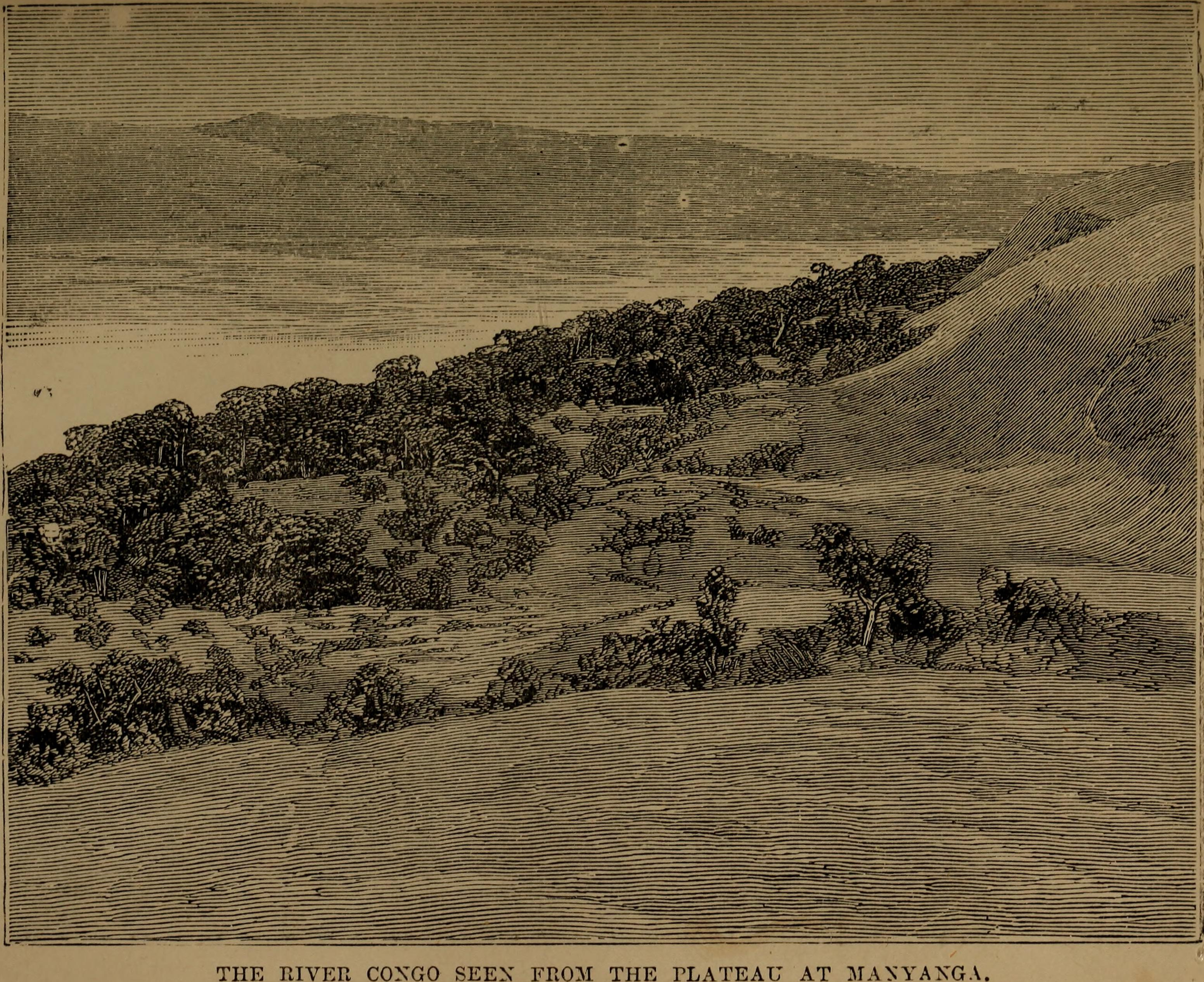
- The River Congo seen from the plateau at Manyanga

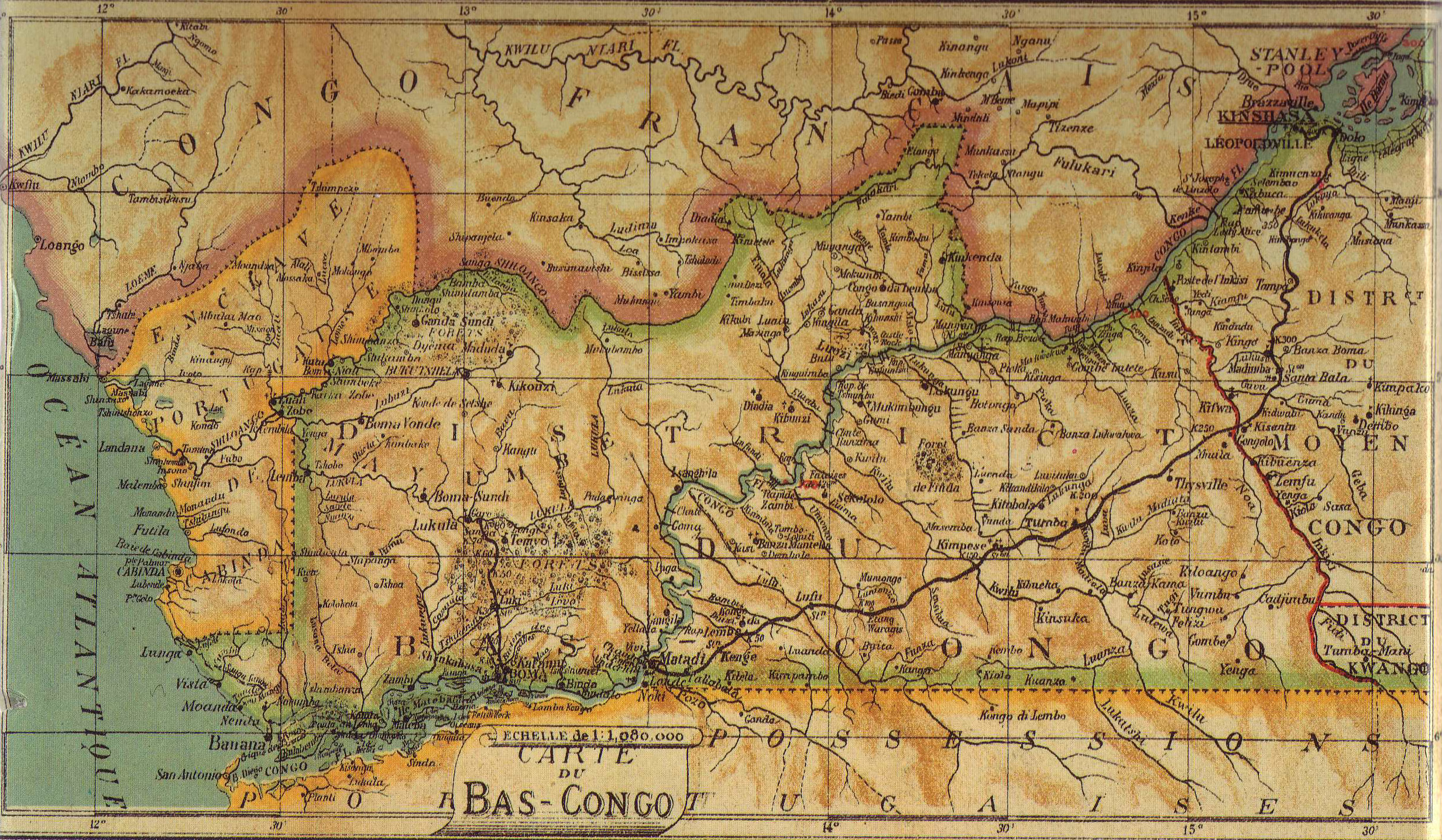
- Bas-Congo District in 1913. Manyanga is on the north (right) bank of the Congo just west of point where the French border is defined by the Congo.

- Location within Democratic Republic of the Congo
- Coordinates: 4.894219°S 14.400147°E
- Country: Democratic Republic of the Congo
- Province: Kongo Central
- Territory: Seke-Banza

Manyanga was a staging post on the route from the coast to Léopoldville during the days of the Congo Free State. It was at the upper end of a navigable reach of the Congo River from Isangila, further downstream to the west. Above Manyanga goods had to be carried by land round the falls and rapids to Stanley Pool.

== Location ==
The lower part of the Congo River below Stanley Pool first descends through the Livingstone Falls and rapids, then has a navigable section from Manyanga to Isangila, and then has further rapids and cataracts down to Matadi, from where it is navigable to the Atlantic Ocean.

== History ==
In February 1881 Henry Morton Stanley heard rumours that English missionaries were planning to build a post in the region, and asked Louis Valcke to establish an International African Association (AIA) post at Isanghila before they did so. While Valcke continued to develop the Isanghila post, Stanley took the steamers En Avant and Royal up the navigable stretch of the river to Manyanga, where Stanley started to build a post, which he entrusted to Victor Harou. He charged Charles-Marie de Braconnier with building a road from Manyanga to the mouth of the Lufu River, bypassing the Ntombo-Mataka falls. In May 1881 Stanley fell ill with a serious fever at Manyanga. He was not able to consider moving on to Stanley Pool until mid-June.

The Baptist missionary George Grenfell established a chain of missions at Musuko, Isangila and Manyanga.

An American visitor in May 1885 referred to the station as North Manyanga, opposite South Manyanga Station, or N’Gombe, on the south shore. The decision to build a road along the south shore, avoiding territory claimed by the French, followed by construction of the Matadi-Léopoldville Railway made the laborious route via Manyanga to Léopoldville obsolete. Today named Pioka, the former station is a minor village.

== Sources ==
- Coosemans, Marthe (20 January 1953), "VALCKE (Louis Pierre Alphonse)", Biographie Coloniale Belge, vol. V, Inst. roy. colon. belge
- Hawker, George (1909), The Life of George Grenfell (PDF), London: The Religious Tract Society
- Kucher, Walter (1962–1963), Belgien und der Kongo (PDF), Abhandlungen der Naturhistorischen Gesellschaft Nürnberg (in German), vol. XXXI
- Stanley, Henry Morton (1885), The Congo and the Founding of Its Free State: A Story of Work and Exploration, Cambridge University Press, ISBN 978-1-108-03131-8
- Taunt, Lieutenant E.H. (26 February 1886), US Navy Congo River Expedition of 1885 : Letter from the Secretary of the Navy - 1887, Naples, Italy
