= Vivi, Democratic Republic of the Congo =

First capital of Congo

Coordinates: 5.7936°S 13.4812°E

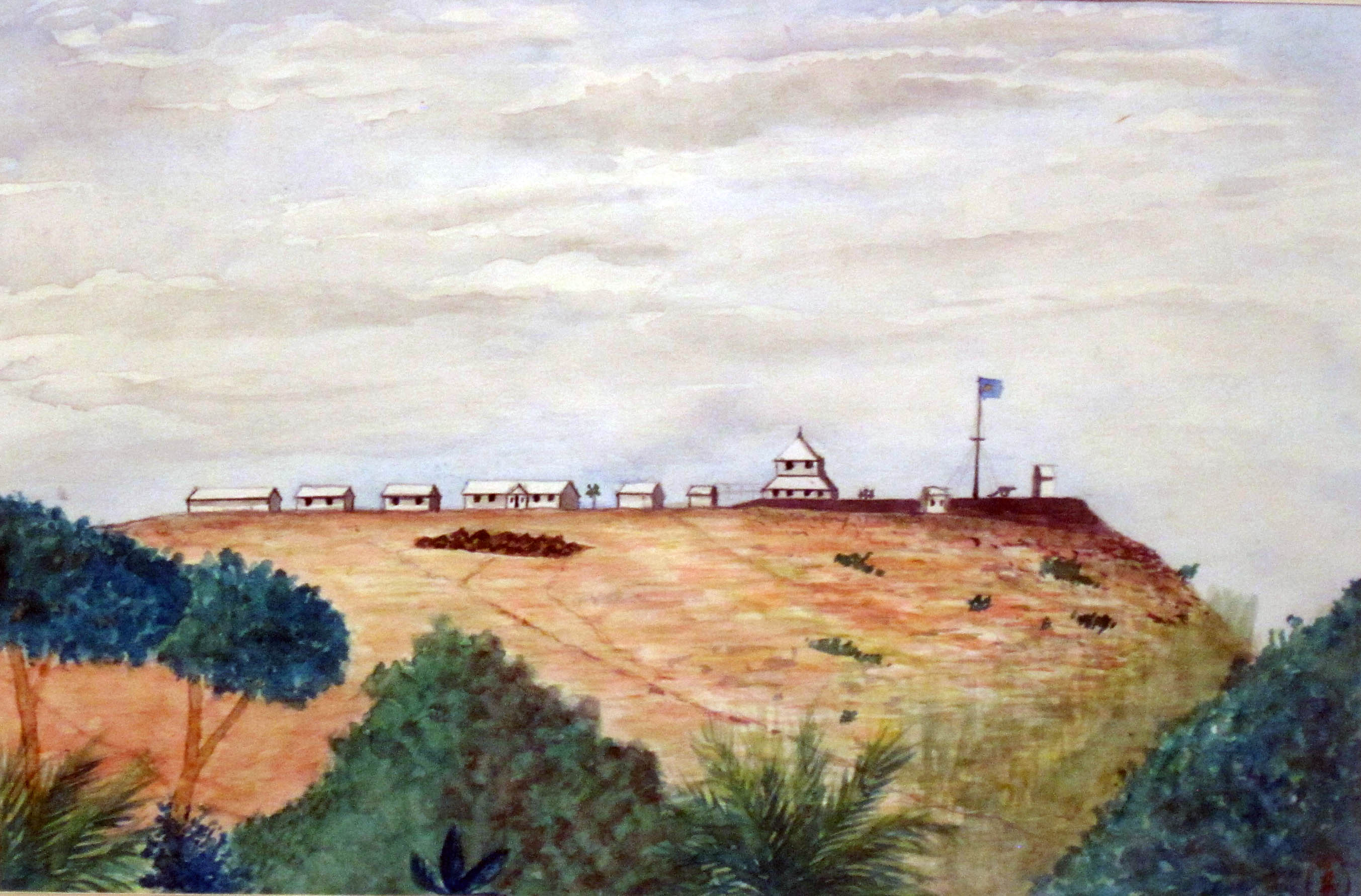
1887 painting of the Station of Vivi during the Congo Free State period.

Vivi is a village in the Kongo Central province of the Democratic Republic of the Congo. It is located on the north side of the Congo River, opposite the provincial capital of Matadi.

It was found in 1879 by Henry Morton Stanley. It served as the first capital of the Congo Free State from July, 1885 to May 1, 1886, when the capital was relocated to Boma.
