= Energy in the Democratic Republic of the Congo =

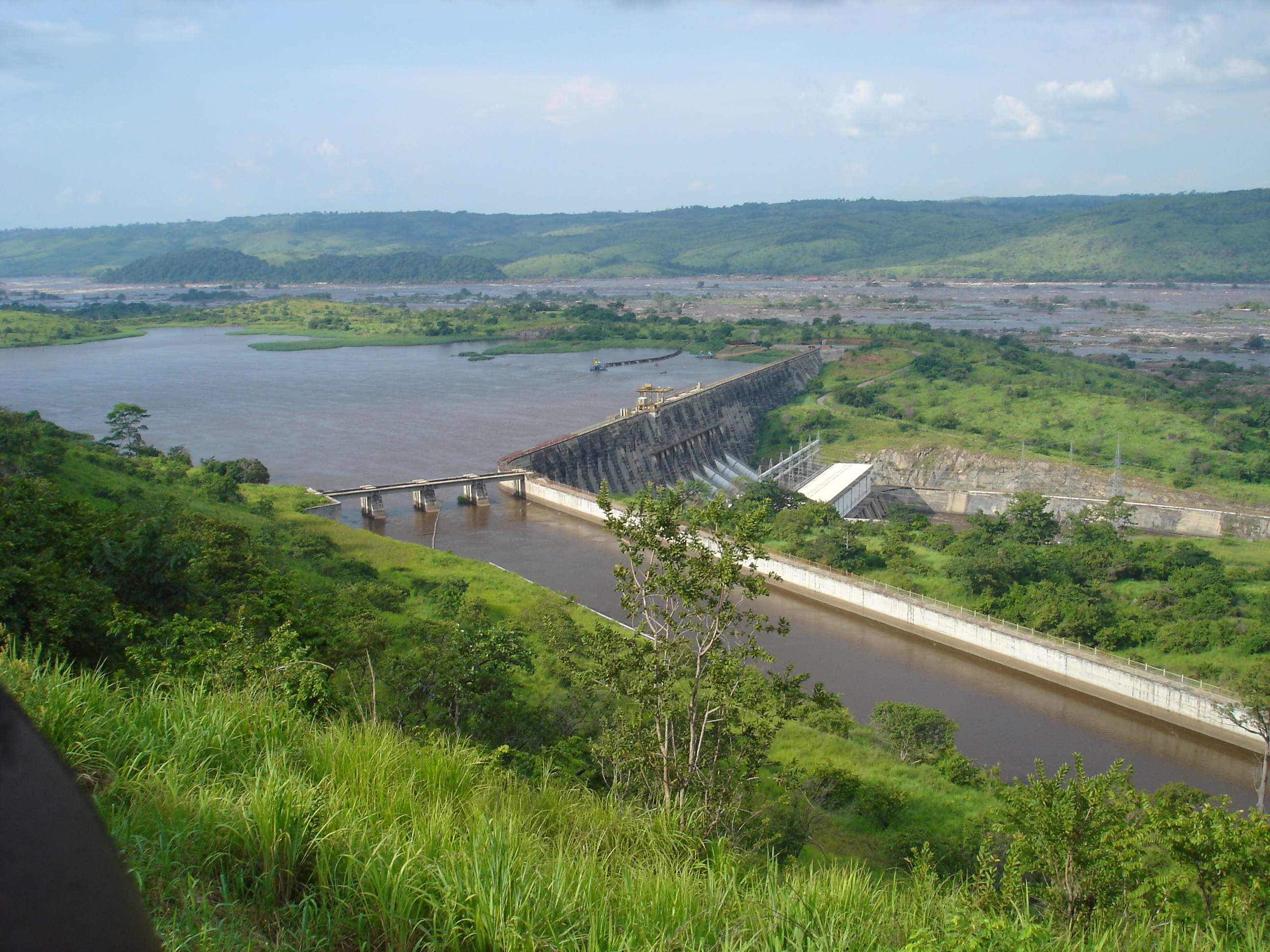
One of the Inga dams, a major source of hydroelectricity in the Democratic Republic of the Congo

The Democratic Republic of the Congo was a net energy exporter in 2008. Most energy was consumed domestically in 2008. According to the IEA statistics the energy export was in 2008 small and less than from the Republic of Congo. 2010 population figures were 3.8 million for the RC compared to CDR 67.8 million.

== Electricity ==
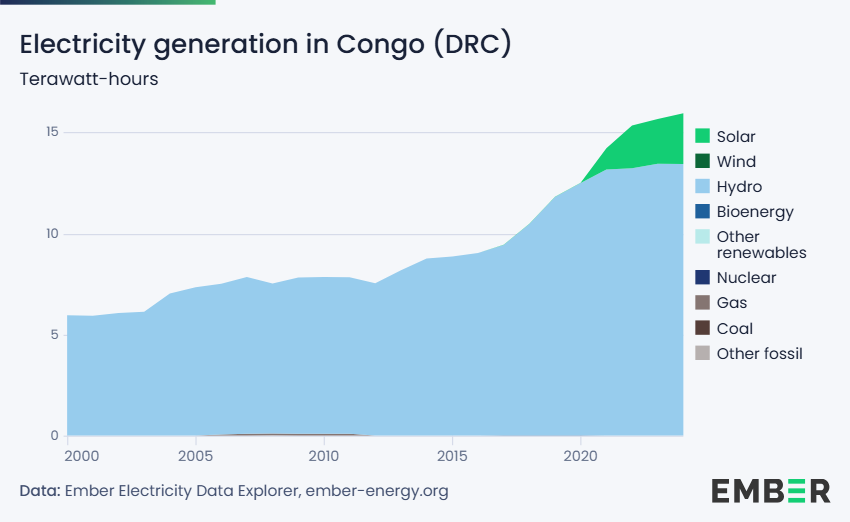
Electricity generation in Congo (DRC) in terawatt-hours

The Democratic Republic of the Congo has reserves of petroleum, natural gas, coal, and a potential hydroelectric power generating capacity of around 100,000 MW. The Inga Dam on the Congo River has the potential capacity to generate 40,000 to 45,000 MW of electric power, sufficient to supply the electricity needs of the whole Southern Africa region. Ongoing uncertainties in the political arena, and a resulting lack of interest from investors has meant that the Inga Dam's potential has been limited.

In 2001, the dam was estimated to have an installed generating capacity of 2,473 MW. It is estimated that the dam is capable of producing no more than 650–750 MW, because two-thirds of the facility's turbines do not work. The African Development bank agreed to supply $8 million towards dam expansion. The government has also agreed to strengthen the Inga-kolwezi and Inga-South Africa interconnections and to construct a second power line to supply power to Kinshasa.

In 2007, the DR Congo had a gross production of public and self-produced electricity of 8.3 TWh. The DR Congo imported 78 million kWh of electricity in 2007. The DR Congo is also an exporter of electric power. In 2003, electric power exports came to 1.3 TWh, with power transmitted to the Republic of Congo and its capital, Brazzaville, as well as to Zambia and South Africa. There were plans to build the Western Power Corridor (Westcor) to supply electricity from Inga III hydroelectric power plant to the Democratic Republic of the Congo, Angola, Namibia, Botswana and South Africa.

The national power company is Société nationale d'électricité (SNEL).

Only 13% of the country has access to electricity. As of 2003, 98.2% of electricity was produced by hydroelectric power.

The DRC a member of three electrical power pools: SAPP (Southern African Power Pool), EAPP (East African Power Pool), and CAPP (Central African Power Pool).

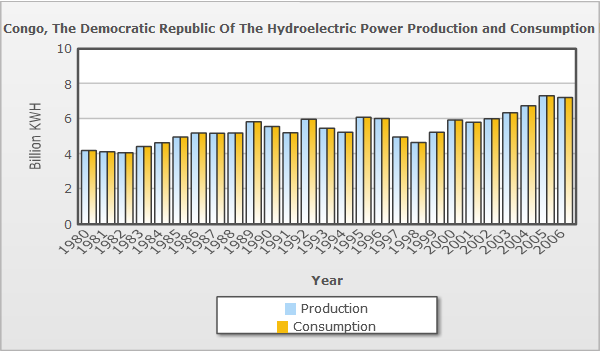

=== Hydropower ===
In the 1930s a large hydroelectric power station in Mwadingusha was built, serving the mining industry of Haute-Katanga. Transmission lines of 120 and 50 kV connected to Lubumbashi and Likasi.

The country has vast potential in hydroelectricity. The second stage of the hydroelectric dam was completed in 1982 on the lower Congo River at Inga Falls, with a large portion of its power production supplying hydroelectricity to the mining industry and Kinshasa. Further plans are to build the proposed 11,050 MW Inga III hydropower project with the construction of two dams. There will be approximately 2,000 km and 3,000 km of transmissions lines within the DRC and across its borders respectively. The Inga III hydropower project is expected to electrify Kinshasa, lead to the development of the DRC's mining sector, and exported hydroelectricity.

== Petroleum ==
The DROC has crude oil reserves that are second only to Angola's in southern Africa. As of 2009, the DROC's crude oil reserves came to 29 million cubic metres (180 million barrels). In 2008, the DROC produced 3,173 cubic metres (19,960 bbl) of oil per day and consumed 1,700 cubic metres (11,000 bbl) per day. As of 2007, the DROC exported 3,194 cubic metres (20,090 bbl) per day and imported 1,805 cubic metres (11,350 bbl) per day.

In 2007, the DROC produced 836,000 metric tons of crude petroleum, exported 836,000 metric tons and had a reserve of 25,000,000 metric tons. The DROC had no refining capacity as of 1 January 2005, and must import refined petroleum products. In 2002, imports of refined petroleum products totaled 1,301 cubic metres (8,180 bbl) per day.

Oil product imports consist of a range of refined fuels, including gasoline, jet fuel, kerosene, aviation gas, fuel oil, and liquefied petroleum gas (LPG). The 2012 estimates of the DRC's petroleum reserves are divided into offshore and onshore categories. Offshore reserves amount to approximately 84,491,000 barrels of proven reserves and 4,613,000 barrels of probable reserves. Onshore reserves are significantly higher, with 177,320,000 barrels of proven reserves and an additional 4,571,000 barrels of probable reserves.

These fossil fuel resources are mainly located in three major sedimentary basins:

- The Coastal Basin, situated in the province of Kongo Central (formerly Bas-Congo), is the only one currently under production. It spans an area between 5,992 and 7,000 km^{2} and contains crude oil, natural gas (estimated at 24 billion cubic meters as of 1986), and asphaltic limestone with a bitumen content ranging from 11% to 37%, totaling approximately 960 million tons of bitumen.
- The Graben of Tanganyika extends across the eastern provinces of Haut-Uélé, South Kivu, North Kivu, and Haut-Katanga. This basin contains significant methane gas reserves within Lake Kivu, estimated at around 50 billion cubic meters. According to Akim Akilimali Mupe's 2012 study Concurrence oligopolistique dans le secteur pétrolier à Uvira: Recherche de l'équilibre, Rwanda operates an experimental gas extraction station at the lake, which supplies about 500,000 cubic meters of gas annually to the Bralirwa Brewery.
- The third major deposit, the Central Cuvette Basin, is the largest sedimentary basin in the country and among the most extensive in the world. It covers an area between 750,000 and 800,000 km^{2} and contains sediment layers reaching depths of 900 meters. Confirmed bituminous shale deposits span 15,000 km^{2} between the cities of Kisangani and Ubundu.

The import and export of these products are handled by two primary companies: Cohydro and Dalbit Petroleum. The latter is a Kenya-based energy firm that supplies petroleum products to Lubumbashi and northeastern parts of the DRC. Within the country, petroleum production is geographically restricted to the coastal basin and is managed by a few major operators. Offshore operations are conducted by the GULF group, which includes Gulfoil Congo SARL and Congo Gulf Oil Company, in collaboration with international partners such as Teikoku (Japan Petroleum Congo SARL), Japeco, COPECO, and UNOCAL. Onshore production is overseen by the FI NAREP group and ZAIREP SOREPZA (ZAIREP SPRL), a consortium comprising PetroFina and Shell.

The refining and distribution of petroleum products are centered around SOCIR (Société Congolaise des Industries de Raffinage), the country's sole major refining facility. Located on the Atlantic coast near the mouth of the Congo River, roughly 600 kilometers southwest of Kinshasa, SOCIR was established as a joint venture equally owned by the Congolese state and the Italian oil company Azienda generale italiana petroli (AGIP). The refinery had an installed capacity of 750,000 tons per year and produced LPG, super gasoline, kerosene, diesel, Jet A-1 fuel, and fuel oil. It was designed to meet the entirety of domestic demand for diesel and fuel oil, 88% of gasoline needs, and 86% of jet fuel consumption. Despite its strategic importance, SOCIR operated at less than 30% of its full capacity and ceased refining operations in 1995. Since then, the country has depended entirely on imported petroleum products to satisfy domestic consumption. Although SOCIR no longer refines crude oil, it remains a key component of the national petroleum infrastructure, particularly through its partnership with SEP Congo for the storage and distribution of imported fuels. Following the closure of SOCIR, the DRC established three principal supply routes for petroleum imports. The Western Route, via the Atlantic coast, became the most significant channel, consistently accounting for 85–90% of the country's fuel imports. In addition to this dominant route, the Southern Route and the Eastern Route were also utilized, though they contributed far less to the national supply.

Between 1992 and 1997, the Western Route consistently supplied over 80% of the national demand.

| Year | East (%) | South (%) | West (%) |
|---|---|---|---|
| 1992 | 3 | 7 | 90 |
| 1994 | 3 | 12 | 85 |
| 1995 | 3 | 12 | 85 |
| 1996 | 2 | 13 | 85 |
| 1997 | 6 | 13 | 81 |

(Source: Ministry of Economy, La politique pétrolière de 1998)

The DRC held 990 million cubic metres (35 billion cubic feet) of proven gas reserves as of 2017. There was no production, consumption or importation or exportation of natural gas. Galaxy Moriah Oil is the government contracted supplier of oil for the DROC.

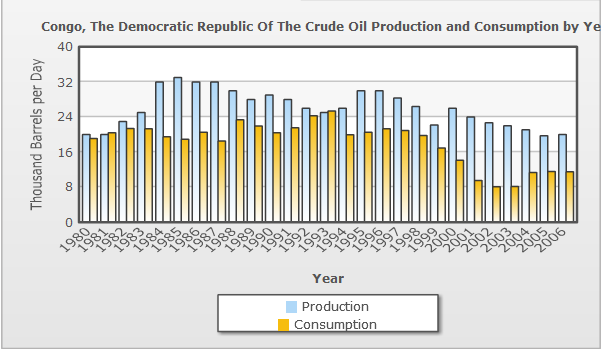

== Coal ==
As of July 2005, the DROC is reported to have coal reserves of 97 million short tons. Domestic coal production and consumption in 2003 totaled 0.11 million short tons and 0.26 million shorts tons, respectively.

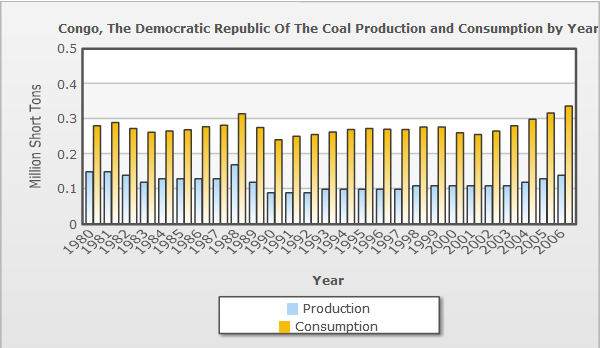

== Renewable energy (other than hydroelectric) ==
ICTs for climate change mitigation

One of the UN Millennium Development Goals is to make the benefits of new technologies - especially information and communications technologies (ICTs) – available to both industrialized nations and developing regions. In light of these goals, several projects have been founded by the International Telecommunication Union (ITU), Organisation for Economic Co-operation and Development (OECD), World Wide Fund for Nature (WWF), and other organisations in order to explore ICTs and climate change.

Climate change legislation

The DRC has no national climate change policy and strategy which can present the DRC's current and future efforts to effectively address its climate change vulnerability and adaptation. It currently relies on environment-related policies and action plans to implement climate change initiatives and activities. Nevertheless, several NGOs and donor agencies have been active in the DRC to develop an administrative structure to address the needs of environmental protection and natural resources management.

The DRC is in a very high level sun belt that makes the installation of photovoltaic systems and the use of thermal solar systems viable throughout the country. Currently there are 836 solar power systems, with a total power of 83 kW, located in Equateur (167), Katanga (159), Nord-Kivu (170), the two Kasaï provinces (170), and Bas-Congo (170). There is also the 148 Caritas network system, with a total power of 6.31 kW7. The potential for further solar development is high.

The DRC has a wide diversity of natural resources, allowing it to consider a significant growth in hydro, wind and solar energy. It has been called "a virtual continent." For the first time in Africa, the DRC has adopted an interactive atlas of renewable energy sources.

This atlas was created by the UNDP, Netherlands Development Organization SNV, and the Congolese Ministry of Water Resources and Electricity. It has 600 interactive maps and informs policymaking on decentralizing energy and encourages further renewable energy investments.

== See also ==
- List of power stations in Congo
- Inga dams
- Renewable energy by country
