= Zongo II Hydroelectric Power Station =

Dam in the Democratic Republic of the Congo

Zongo II Dam Barrage de Zongo
- Location of Zongo II Power Station; Placement on map is approximate Zongo II Dam; Barrage de Zongo (Africa) Zongo II Dam; Barrage de Zongo (Earth)
- Location: Zongo, Central Kongo Province, Democratic Republic of the Congo
- Coordinates: 04°46′57″S 14°54′22″E
- Construction began: 2012
- Opening date: 2018
- Construction cost: US$360 million

Dam and spillways
- Type of dam: Gravity dam
- Impounds: Inkisi River

Power Station
- Commission date: 2018
- Turbines: 150 MW (3 x 50 MW)
- Installed capacity: 150 MW (200,000 hp)

The Zongo II Power Station, also Zongo 2 Power Station, (French: Centrale hydroélectrique de Zongo II) is a 150 MW hydroelectric power station across the Inkisi River that harnesses the energy of the Zongo Falls in the Democratic Republic of the Congo. Construction began on 14 March 2012 and concluded in 2018. The power station was officially inaugurated on 22 June 2018 by the President of the DR Congo, Joseph Kabila.

== Location ==
Zongo II Dam is located in the village of Zongo, in Central Kongo Province, in southwestern DR Congo. The power station lies across the Inkisi River, (a tributary of the Congo River), approximately 78 kilometres (48 mi) southwest of Kinshasa, the capital and largest city in that country. This is about 275 kilometres (171 mi), by road, northeast of the port of Matadi, on the coast of the Atlantic Ocean.

The coordinates of Zongo II Power Station are 04°46'57.0"S, 14°54'22.0"E (Latitude:-4.782500; Longitude:14.906111).

Zongo II HPP sits at the location, formerly occupied by Zongo I Hydroelectric Power Plant. The 75 megawatts power station was constructed between 1955 and 1965. It comprised five turbines, each with capacity of 15 megawatts. By the time it was replaced, output had greatly diminished due to equipment obsolescence and lack of maintenance, over its 60-year lifespan.

== Overview ==
The installed capacity at Zongo II HPP is 150 megawatts. The energy produced here is purchased by Société Nationale d'Électricité (SNEL), for integration into the national electricity grid under a long-term power purchase agreement. A 220kV high voltage transmission line measuring 70 kilometres (43 mi) conveys the energy from the power station to the SNEL substation at Kinsuka, in Kinshasa, where the energy enters into the national grid.

== Development, funding and timeline ==
The engineering, procurement, and construction contract was awarded to Sinohydro, the Chinese state-owned, hydropower engineering and construction company, at a contract price of US$360 million.

The funds were borrowed by the Government of DR Congo, from the Exim Bank of China at an interest rate of 2 percent per annum, over a 20-year period, beginning the day of commercial commissioning.

Construction began in 2012 and was originally scheduled for three years. However, due to delays, it took six years to complete the dam and power station, which came online in June 2018.

== See also ==
- List of power stations in the Democratic Republic of the Congo
