= Kolwezi Solar Power Station =

Solar power station in the Democratic Republic of the Congo

- Country: Democratic Republic of the Congo
- Location: Kolwezi, Lualaba Province
- Coordinates: 10°37′01″S 25°27′58″E
- Status: Proposed
- Owner: Kolwezi Solar Consortium
- Operator: Kolwezi Solar Limited

Solar farm
- Type: Flat-panel PV

Power generation
- Nameplate capacity: 100 MW (130,000 hp)

The Kolwezi Solar Power Station is a proposed 100 MW (130,000 hp) solar power plant in the Democratic Republic of the Congo. The power station is under development by a number of independent power producers and international financial institutions. The energy from this solar farm will be sold to the Société Nationale d'Électricité (SNEL), the national electricity utility company.

== Location ==
The power station would be located in city of Kolwezi, the provincial headquarters of Lualaba Province, in the southeastern part of the Democratic Republic of the Congo. Kolwezi is located west of Likasi and lies approximately 302 kilometres (188 mi), northwest of the city of Lubumbashi, the nearest large city.

== Overview ==
The power station has a planned maximum generation capacity of 100 megawatts. The owner/developers of this solar farm are expected to form a special vehicle company to own, design, finance, build, operate and maintain the power station. The table below illustrates a partial list of the potential shareholders in the SPV company. For descriptive purposes we will call the SPV Kolwezi Solar Limited.

Potential Shareholding In Kolwezi Solar Limited
| Rank | Shareholder | Domicile | Percentage | Notes |
|---|---|---|---|---|
| 1 | International Finance Corporation | United States | | |
| 2 | Globeleq | United Kingdom | | |
| 3 | Greenshare Energy | South Africa | | |
| 4 | Greenshare Congo | DR Congo | | |
| 5 | Volt Renewables | South Africa | | |
| 6 | Nzuri Energy | South Africa | | |

== Construction costs ==
The engineering, procurement and construction contract is yet to be awarded, as of December 2021. The construction costs have been reported as US$148 million.

== Other considerations ==
A long-term power purchase agreement has already been executed between the solar farm developers/owners and SNEL. The power station will provide an estimated 250 GWh of clean energy to the national grid of DR Congo, enough to supply 1.25 million Congolese people. Other beneficiaries include mines in the Lualaba Province, including those of copper, cobalt, gold, uranium and radium.

== See also ==
- List of power stations in the Democratic Republic of the Congo
