= List of planned renewable energy projects =

This is a list of the largest planned renewable energy projects rated by proposed generating capacity (larger than 5 GW).

Project	Location	Proposed capacity (GW)	Year Announced	Completion Year	Type	Use	references
Green Energy Oman	Oman	25GW	2021		Solar, Wind	Green hydrogen production	
South Korea Offshore Wind Project	South Korea	8.2GW	2021		Offshore wind		
Asian Renewable Energy Hub	Australia	26GW	2014		Solar, Wind	Green hydrogen production	
Western Green Energy Hub	Australia	50GW	2021		Solar, Wind	3.5 million tonnes per year of green hydrogen production	
China Desert Project	China	100GW	2021		Solar, Wind		
Australia-Asia Power Link	Australia, Indonesia, Singapore	17-20GW	2019	2028	Solar	Electricity, Also called SunCable	
Grand Inga Dam	Democratic Republic of the Congo	40-70GW			Hydro	Electricity	
Ulan Qab Wind Power Base	China	6GW	2019				
Kubuqi desert project	China	455 GW	2022				
