= Inga–Shaba HVDC =

HVDC transmission line in the Democratic Republic of Congo

Inga–Shaba EHVDC
- Route of the Inga–Shaba EHVDC in Democratic Republic of Congo

Location
- Country: Democratic Republic of Congo
- Coordinates: 05°31′27″S 13°36′39″E; 04°42′43″S 15°17′41″E; 05°06′39″S 18°47′06″E; 05°59′26″S 22°26′52″E; 08°44′43″S 24°52′30″E; 10°39′27″S 25°27′08″E
- From: Inga hydroelectric complex
- To: Shaba (Katanga)

Ownership information
- Operator: Société nationale d'électricité (SNEL)

Construction information
- Contractors: Morrison-Knudsen International, ASEA, Sadelmi-Cogepi, Irish GE subsidiary
- Commissioned: 1982

Technical information
- Type: overhead line
- Current type: HVDC
- Total length: 1,700 km (1,100 mi)
- Capacity: 560 MW
- DC voltage: approx. 500 kV

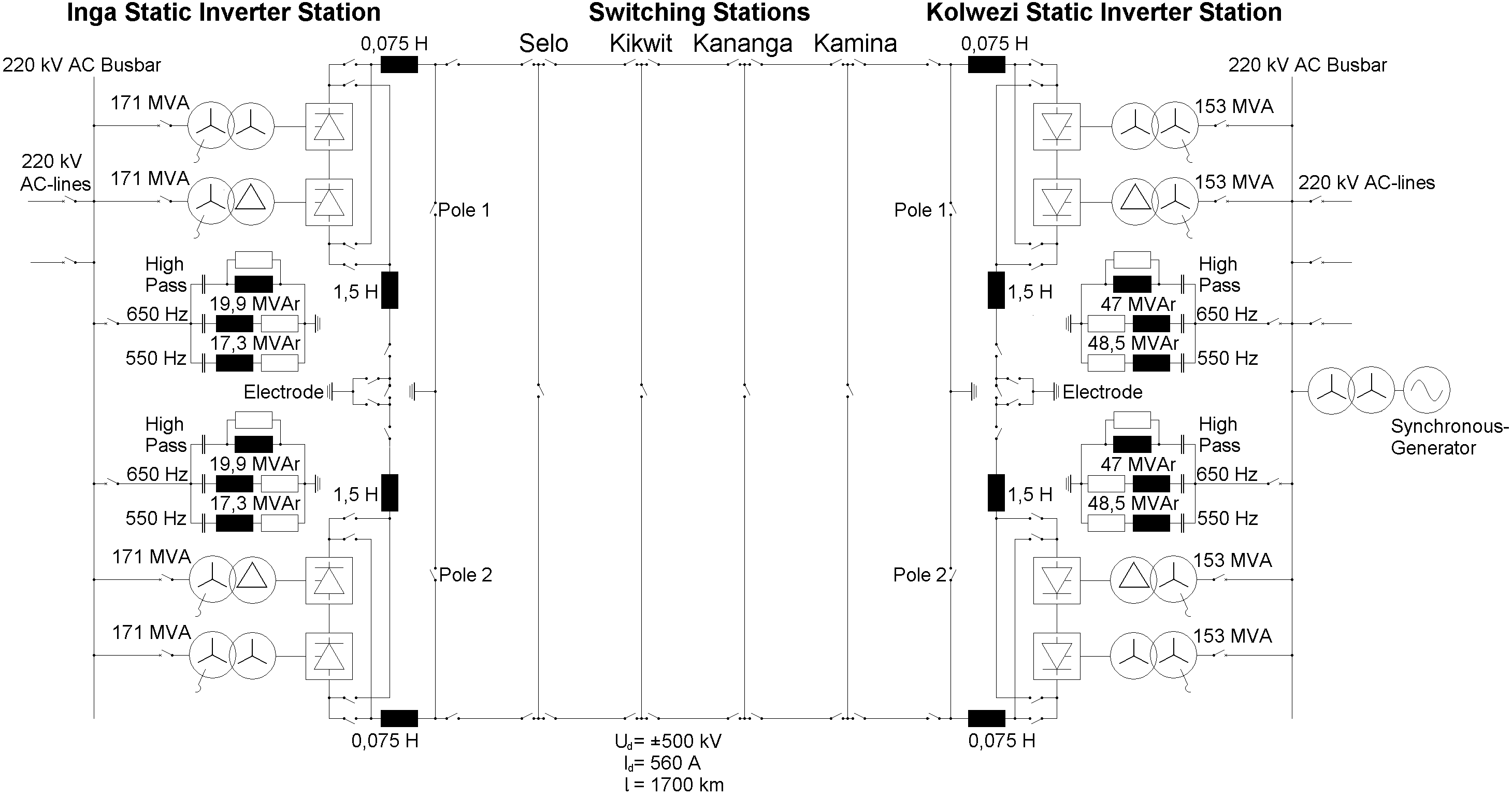
Single Line Diagram of Inga-Shaba HVDC

The Inga–Shaba EHVDC Intertie (officially: The Inga–Shaba Extra High Voltage D.C. Intertie; nickname: Inga–Shaba and also referred to as Inga–Kolwezi) is a 1,700 kilometres (1,100 mi)-long high-voltage direct current overhead electric power transmission line in the Democratic Republic of Congo, linking the Inga hydroelectric complex at the mouth of the Congo River to mineral fields in Shaba (Katanga). It was primarily constructed by Morrison-Knudsen International, an American engineering company, with the converter equipment supplied by ASEA. Construction was completed in 1982 and it cost US$900 million. The scheme was, for many years, the longest HVDC line in the world.

== History ==
The Inga–Shaba HVDC represented one of the United States' most important third world commitments of the 1970s and 1980s. However, construction progress was plagued by rebel insurgency in Southern Zaire, massive logistical challenges, large cost overruns, and financing delays.

By utilizing the hydroelectric potential of the Inga Dam and by constructing one switching station near Kinshasa at Selo, the Government of Zaire under Mobutu Sese Seko was theoretically able to control the flow of power to secession-prone Katanga, then Shaba, province, but never actually exercised this option. It was reported in La Libre Belgique, a Brussels newspaper, that Tractionel, a Belgian electrical contractor, had argued that more economical alternatives were available nearer Shaba, using low-head generator plants, but had been overlooked in favor of the American consortium, consisting of Morrison-Knudsen International as a prime contractor, and Swedish ASEA, Italian Sadelmi-Cogepi and Irish GE subsidiary as sub-contractors.

The project was initially conceived as a US$250 million contract - but cost overruns, partly due to unanticipated armed conflict in Shaba Province, pushed the final price up over US$1 billion, with unofficial estimates ranging as high as US$1.3 billion, inclusive of a comprehensive Operations and Maintenance Contract.

Construction of the Inga–Shaba Project provided the Ministry of Energy and the Société nationale d'électricité (SNEL), with the means to promote further development activity throughout Zaire, by attracting potential investors and overseas firms; however, there have been suggestions that well-placed officials in the Mobutu government may have accepted gratuities at various critical junctures during the construction phase. As the Republic became more indebted to overseas financial entities, the Inga–Shaba Project ultimately accounted for approximately 20% of the former Zaire's debt burden, which totaled $5 billion at the time, according to various credible sources.

== Route ==
The ten-year project entailed design and construction of a 1,700-kilometre (1,100 mi) electrical transmission line from Inga (05°31′27″S 13°36′39″E) at the mouth of the Congo River, specifically from the Inga Dam, one of Africa's three largest hydroelectric complexes, to the distant copper mining region then known as Shaba, today Katanga. It featured switching stations at Selo (near Kinshasa) (04°42′43″S 15°17′41″E), Kikwit (05°06′39″S 18°47′06″E), Kananga (05°59′26″S 22°26′52″E) and Kamina (08°44′43″S 24°52′30″E), prior to delivering power to the Kolwezi Inverter Station(10°39′27″S 25°27′08″E).

== Electrodes ==
The electrode for the Inga static inverter plant is situated 39 kilometres away from the station at 5°20′6″S 13°39′21″E and designed as linear ground electrode with a resistance of 0.24 ohm, while the electrode of Kolwezi static inverter plant, which is situated 11 kilometres away from the station at 10°36′27″S 25°32′20″E is designed as three-legged ground star electrode with a resistance of 0.14 ohm.

== Technology ==
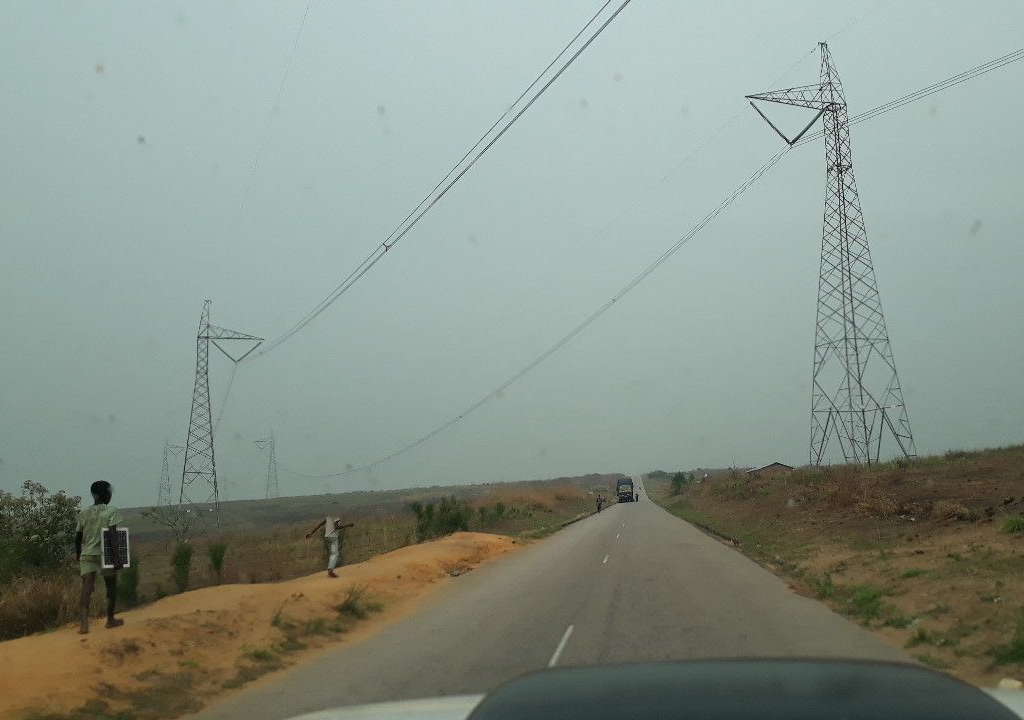
Pylons of the HVDC

This scheme, equipped from the outset with thyristor valves provided by Swedish subcontractor ASEA, was designed to transmit 560 megawatts, in the first phase, at a symmetrical bipolar voltage of ±500 kilovolts. Although not the first 500 kV HVDC project in operation (the ±533 kV Cahora Bassa scheme having been completed in 1977) it was the first such scheme to use only a single twelve-pulse bridge per pole. Consequently, its thyristor valves were the highest-rated in the world (in terms of voltage) at the time and remained so until the completion, in 2007, of the ±450 kV, single-converter NorNed scheme. The thyristor valves for Inga Shaba had 258 thyristors in series in each valve and were air-insulated and air-cooled.

Inga Shaba was the longest HVDC transmission line in service until 2010, when it was overtaken by the 2071 km, ±800 kV, 6400 MW HVDC link from Xiangjiaba Dam to Shanghai in China. Because the line runs through relatively inaccessible terrain, an unusually broad right-of-way was cleared, at considerable expense, to ensure tower integrity.

The line operated initially at only 10% of capacity. In the 1990s, prior to major social unrest, the line increased its power transmission to 200 MW, still considerably below design capacity. As of 2000, reliability had been poor with many thyristor failures at the inverter station. As of 2010, the line was still functional as far as Bandundu, the capital of Bandundu province, approximately 400 kilometres (250 mi) northeast of Kinshasa. In 2009 ABB was awarded a contract to refurbish and modernise the converter equipment. This upgrade is due to be completed in 2013.

== See also ==
- Grand Inga Dam
- High-voltage direct current

== Bibliography ==
- Kwitny, Jonathan Endless Enemies: The Making of an Unfriendly World (1984; ISBN 0-14-008093-7)

Nzongola-Ntalaja, Georges. The Congo from Leopold to Kabila: A People's History. New York: Zed Books, 2002.
