= Lubero =

Town in North Kivu Province, Democratic Republic of the Congo

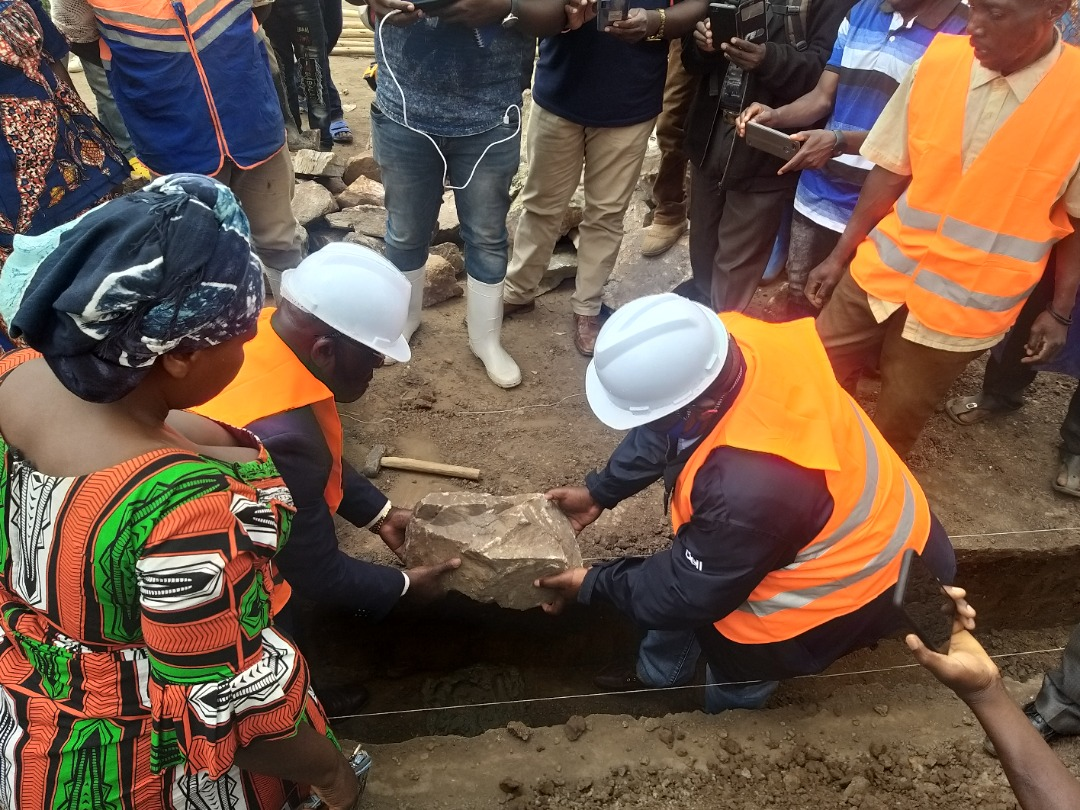
- Construction of a market in Lubero, 2022

- Location within Democratic Republic of the Congo
- Coordinates: 00°09′18″S 29°14′24″E
- Country: Democratic Republic of the Congo
- Province: North Kivu
- Time zone: UTC+2 (Central Africa Time)
- National language: Swahili
- Climate: Cfb

Lubero is a town in the North Kivu Province of the Democratic Republic of the Congo. It is the administrative center of the Lubero Territory. Following the surrender of the Mai-Mai fighters in 2021, construction of a new market began in 2022, involving the mayor, ex-soldiers, "young people at risk and the vulnerable women". As of March 2014, the population of Lubero is not publicly known.

== Location ==
The town is lies at an average altitude of 1,900 metres (6,200 ft), in the Virunga Mountains, at the western edge of Virunga National Park, close to the international border with Uganda. Lubero lies approximately 210 kilometres (130 mi), by road, north of the provincial capital of Goma. This location is approximately 98 kilometres (61 mi), by road, southwest of Beni, the nearest large town.

== Overview ==
Lubero is a medium-sized town with several modern amenities including an airport, Lubero Airport, with a grass runway. In the hills around the town, a mini-hydropower station, Lubero Hydroelectric Power Station, is planned to complement Mutwanga Hydroelectric Power Station and Rutshuru Hydroelectric Power Station, in supplying power to the communities in and around Virunga National Park.

Like most localities in North Kivu, Lubero has witnessed plenty of violence as the various militias have battled each other for real estate and treasure during the last two decades. Battles have also been fought between the militias, government forces and United Nations "peace keepers". The toll in human lives has been high. Many have been left with physical disabilities. More suffer long-term psychological war trauma.

In 2022 MONUSCO announced that work had begun to build a market here involving ex-combatants as part of their integration into the community. The market was designed to offer protection to vulnerable women.

On August 27, 2022, at least five people were stabbed, and several houses were burned during a community conflict, which opposes the inhabitants of the localities of Matulu and Bukununu in the Musindi Groupement south of Lubero territory in North Kivu.

On September 7, 2022, four people of the same family were reported dead in a house collapse in Lukanga, the capital of the Bukenye Groupement, in the Lubero territory of North Kivu.

On September 19, 2022, two people were killed in the village of Musenda, in the chiefdom of Bashaga, in the territory of Lubero, in North Kivu, during an incursion of the Mai-Mai militiamen of the Chandenga group.

In September 2022, ten cases of kidnappings were reported in the locality of Bunyangingi, in the Itala Groupement in the Lubero territory, North Kivu.

On September 25, 2022, a young man died after a grenade explosion in a Kipese village in the Bulengya Groupement, Lubero territory, North Kivu.

In October 2022, the FARDC (Forces Armées de la République Démocratique du Congo) killed six militiamen belonging to the Mai-Mai coalition of Mazembe and Baraka. The Congolese army retrieved three of their weapons of war during the fighting in Matembe village in the Lubero territory, North Kivu.

In December 2022, two people died as a result of clashes between the Mai-Mai group of the Front des Patriotes pour la Paix (FPP/AP) of Kabido to the unidentified armed group of Kasinga village, in the Ngulo group, Lubero territory, North Kivu.

In January and February 2023, at least 23 civilians were killed, more were reported missing, and thousands more were displaced as a result of clashes between Mai-Mai armed groups of the Front des Patriotes pour la Paix (FPP/AP) of Kabido, the Union des Patriotes congolais (UPC) of Kilalo and the Yira-Force and Mazembe coalition.

In March 2023, nine people were killed and several others went missing following the armed attack carried out by ADF terrorists in the Nguli village in the Lubero territory, North Kivu, according to the provincial deputy Jean-Paul Lumbulumbu. In the same month, the rebels took civilians hostage in the village of Katiri in Isale Kasongwere Groupement, in the Beni territory, North Kivu. Parenthetically, the insurgents also erected a stronghold in the Virunga National Park between the villages of Kavasewa and Karuruma.

In January 2026, ADF rebels took the lives of 15 people in 3 different villages in the Lubero territory using bladed weapons.

== Notable residents ==
- Lucie Kamuswekera (born 1944), artist.

== Gallery ==
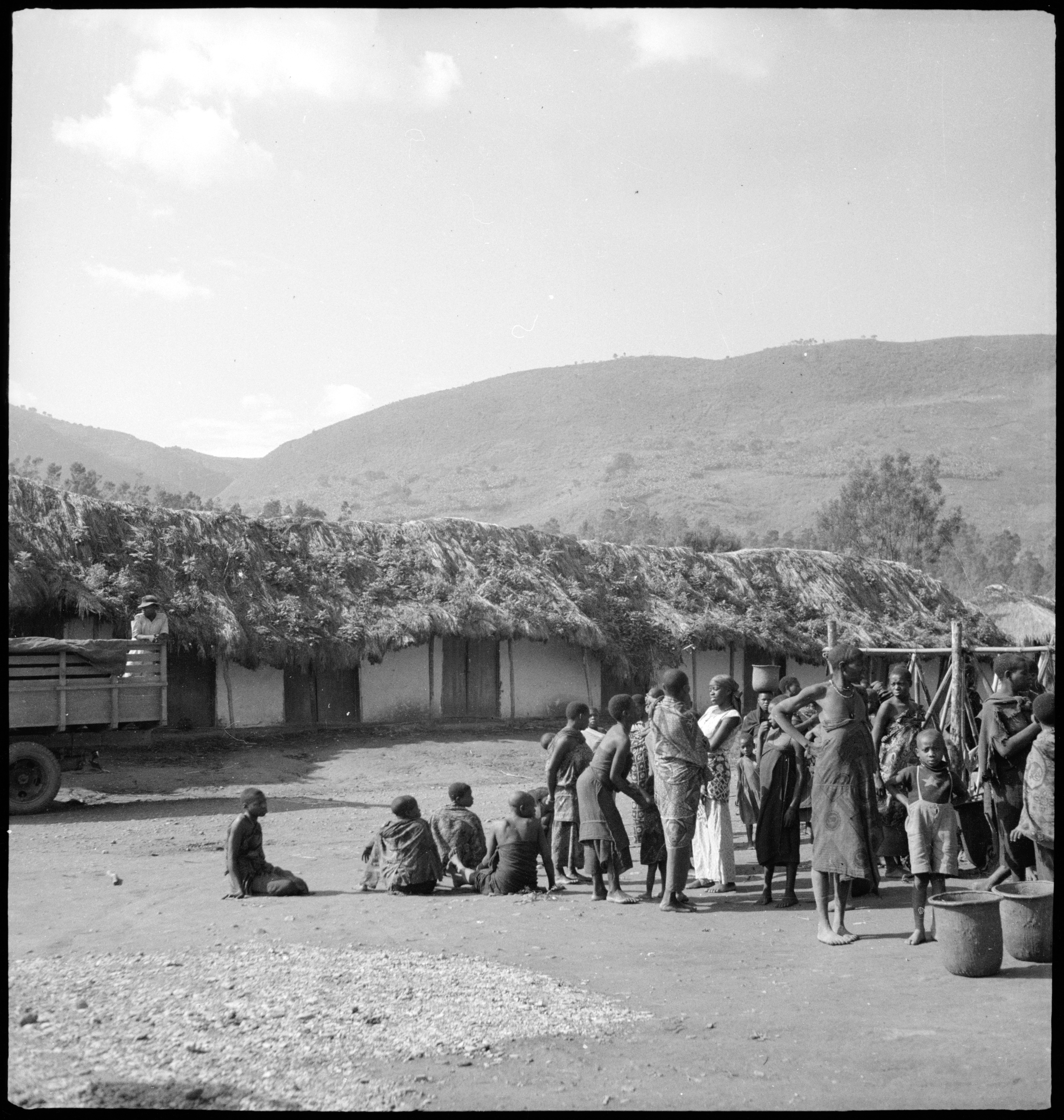
Lubero in the 1940s as part of the Belgian Congo

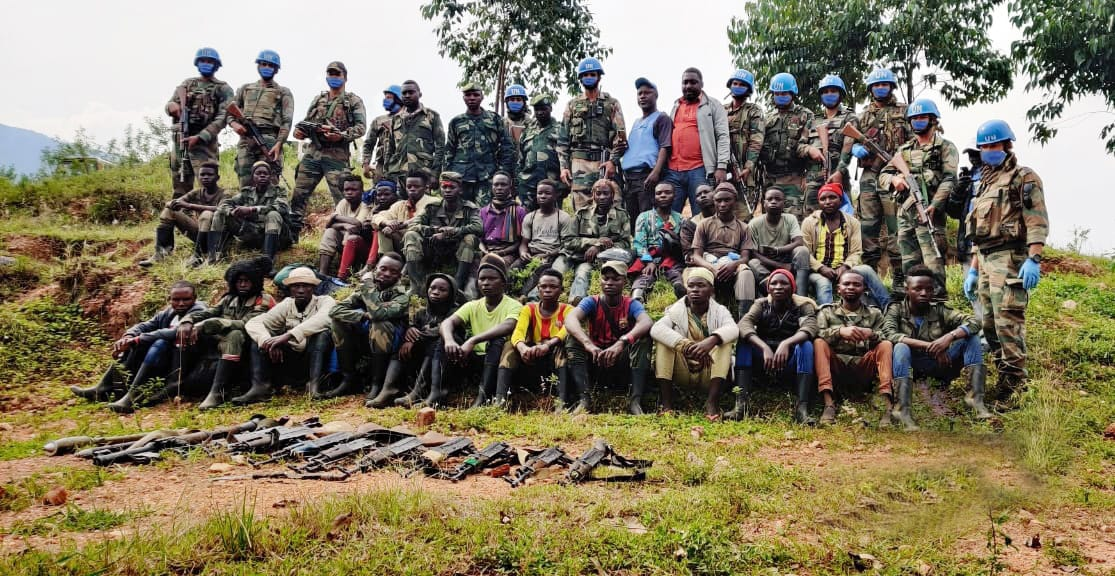
Mai-Mai militia surrender to MONUSCO Indian peacekeepers in Lubero on 17 July 2020

== See also ==
- United Nations Force Intervention Brigade
- MONUC
- March 23 Movement
- National Congress for the Defence of the People
- Rally for Congolese Democracy
- Rally for Congolese Democracy–Goma
- Democratic Forces for the Liberation of Rwanda
- Mai Mai
- Rutshuru
- Masisi
- Western Rift Valley
