= Piana–Mwanga Hydroelectric Power Station =

Hydroelectric power station in the Democratic Republic of the Congo

- Map of DRC showing the location of Mpiana–Mwanga Dam
- Country: DR Congo
- Location: Piana Mwanga, Manono Territory, Tanganyika Province
- Coordinates: 07°38′55″S 28°05′36″E
- Purpose: Power
- Status: Proposed
- Owner: AVZ Minerals Limited
- Operator: AVZ Power Limited

Dam and spillways
- Impounds: Luvua River

Power Station
- Operator: AVZ Power Limited
- Commission date: 2023 Expected
- Type: Run-of-the-river
- Installed capacity: 54 MW (72,000 hp)

Piana–Mwanga Hydroelectric Power Station, also Mpiana–Mwanga Hydroelectric Power Station, is a 54 megawatts (72,000 hp) hydroelectric power station in the Democratic Republic of the Congo. The power plant was originally commissioned in 1933 to service a nearby tin mine. The tin mine was mothballed in 1982 and so was the power station. In 2020, the mining conglomerate AVZ Minerals Limited, reached an agreement to rehabilitate the power station to power its mining operations in Manono Territory, including the Manono–Kitotolo Mine, one of the largest lithium mines in the DRC, whose reserves are estimated at 120,000,000 tonnes (132,277,357 tons) of ore.

== Location ==
The power station is located across the Luvua River (a tributary of the Congo River), in the town of Piana Mwanga, in Manono Territory, in the Tanganyika Province of DR Congo. This location is approximately 81.5 kilometres (51 mi), by road, southeast of the town of Manono, the territorial capital. Piana Mwanga is located about 394 kilometres (245 mi), by road, southwest of the city of Kalemie, the capital of Tanganyika Province. The geographical coordinates of Piana–Mwanga Hydroelectric Power Station are 07°38'55.0"S, 28°05'36.0"E (Latitude:-7.648611; Longitude:28.093333).

== Overview ==
AVZ Minerals Limited, based in Australia is in the process of developing the lithium and tin Manono–Kitotolo Mine, in the town of Manono, DRC. As part of the infrastructure to develop that development, AVZ, through its subsidiary AVZ Power Limited has agreed with the Congolese authorities to explore the possibility of acquiring the abandoned Piana-Mwanga HPP, rehabilitating it and using the 54 megawatts generated there to support its mining activities in Manono Territory. A feasibility study has been authorized, the outcome of which, will inform those decisions.

== Other considerations ==
When the refurbishment starts, AVZ Power Limited hopes to start with two turbines with capacity of 9 megawatts each, for a total of 18 megawatts. Later, all six turbines will be replaced, for a total of 54 megawatts of output. The transmission grid and distribution network within the town of Manono and in Manono Territory will also require refurbishment.

== See also ==
- List of power stations in the Democratic Republic of the Congo
- Katende Hydroelectric Power Station
