= Kisangani Solar Power Station =

Solar farm in the Democratic Republic of the Congo

- Country: Democratic Republic of the Congo
- Location: Kisangani, Tshopo Province
- Coordinates: 00°32′44″N 25°07′25″E
- Status: Proposed
- Owner: Tshopo Provincial Administration

Solar farm
- Type: Flat-panel PV

Power generation
- Nameplate capacity: 40 MW (54,000 hp)

The Kisangani Solar Power Station is a proposed 40 MW (54,000 hp) solar power plant in the Democratic Republic of the Congo. The power station is owned by the Tshopo Provincial Administration, of which the city of Kisangani is the provincial capital.

== Location ==
The power station would be located near Kisangani, the provincial headquarters of Tshopo Province, along the banks of the Congo River. The solar farm would occupy 65.5 hectares (162 acres) of land.

== Overview ==
The power station has a maximum generation capacity of 40 megawatts. It comprises 155,000 solar panels, connected to 72 solar inverters that will use 36 transformers to feed the electricity produced into the national electricity grid of DR Congo. Its output is to be sold directly to the Société Nationale d'Électricité (SNEL) for integration into the national grid.

== Developers ==
The power station is under development by the provincial administration of Tshopo Province, whose headquarters are located in Kisangani.

== Construction costs and funding ==
The engineering, procurement and construction contract was awarded to Cat Projects Africa, a consulting and engineering conglomerate based in Australia. The estimated cost of the project is reported as US$50 million.

== Project delay ==
In May 2020, international print media reported that the construction of this power station had been delayed due to the COVID-19 pandemic. Construction, which was planned to start in January 2020 and last 12 months, is now on indefinite hold. Meanwhile, the construction cost is quoted at US$52 million.

== See also ==
- List of power stations in the Democratic Republic of the Congo
