= Bundi River =

- Location within Democratic Republic of the Congo

Location
- Country: Democratic Republic of the Congo

Physical characteristics
- Mouth: Congo River
  - coordinates: 5.544539°S 13.552085°E

Basin features
- River system: Congo River

The Bundi River is a river of the Democratic Republic of the Congo. It is a right tributary of the lower Congo River that enters the river below the Inga Falls. If the proposed Grand Inga Dam project goes ahead, the river valley will be flooded to form a huge lake.

== Early European visitors ==
In 1816 Captain James Hingston Tuckey of the British Royal Navy was the first European to visit the Bundi valley. At that time the Inga plateau was the base of a chiefdom with 300 people and 70 huts. The market in Inga prospered from imposing levies on British, Portuguese, French and Belgian slave traders going up river, and on slave caravans coming down to the Atlantic coast.

Henry Morton Stanley visited in February 1880. He speculated that at some time in the past the Congo had run through the Bundi valley, leaving it almost completely level. He wrote, "The Bundi is a beautiful stream of very clear water, brawling in the dry season over rocks and smoothly polished stones and pebbles at the bottom of a deep rocky valley. He said that game was abundant, but unfortunately so were sand-flies, gad-flies and chigoes, while in the yellow creek the crocodiles were numerous. He measured the distance from the Bundi to the Bula River as almost 16 miles (26 km).

Guillaume Casman arrived in Vivi and joined an expedition led by Captain Edmond Hanssens. They left on 21 January 1884 with a column of 30 men, and reached the banks of the Bundi River on 23 January 1884. Rains had made it overflow its banks and turn its valley into a huge swamp. The Swedish officer Peter August Möller passed the river when travelling from Vivi to Isangila. He wrote in 1887:

During our march to Issangila we encamped in the valley of the Bundi river, which is known for its great richness in buffaloes and antelopes of different kinds. We could also observe numerous trails of these animals everywhere. Parts of the river-bed was moreover beaten by hippopotami, that obviously were grazing there [at] night. It was thus very tempting to me to stay there, but our journey did not allow it. I comforted therefore myself with my hopes of having the opportunity to come back to this rich hunting ground in the future.(Möller 1887:49)

== Grand Inga Dam ==
A 2013 BBC article said the DRC had signed a deal with South Africa to sell it power from the planned Grand Inga Dam hydroelectric power project. A single dam wall would feed six power stations that would produce 40,000 megawatts of electricity. The 145 metres (476 ft) tall dam would flood the Bundi valley, which was home to 30,000 villagers, turning the valley into a huge lake. The Congo River would now enter the north end of the lake, and leave through turbines at the dam across the south end. In June 2020 it was reported that President Félix Tshisekedi was planning to present the Grand Inga projects to meetings of the Africans heads of state, to obtain expressions of interest in buying the energy that would be produced.

Opponents of the dam noted that the Bundi valley holds a combination of agricultural lands and natural environments that are home to wildlife. Up to 60,000 people could be displaced, and the network of roads and power lines across the Congo Basin could cause create social and environmental damage. No environmental impact study was planned.

== Sources ==
- Friedman, Kajsa Ekholm (1991), Catastrophe and Creation: The Transformation of an African Culture, Psychology Press, ISBN 978-3-7186-5186-3
- Hughes, Alice (6 June 2016), The Vast Congo River to be Imperiled by the World's Biggest Dam, ALERT
- Ilunga, Patrick (20 June 2020), "DRC goes on with Grand Inga dam project", The East African
- Jullien, Maud (15 November 2013), Can DR Congo's Inga dam project power Africa?, Inga: BBC
- Martrin-Donos, Ch. de (1886), "XX", Les Belges dans l'Afrique Centrale (PDF) (in French)
- Nyanga, Yoletta (8 July 2019), "Power play: Congo's new president could transform Africa with one gigantic hydro-electric dam", Tortoise
- Stanley, Henry Morton (25 August 2011), The Congo and the Founding of Its Free State: A Story of Work and Exploration, Cambridge University Press, ISBN 978-1-108-03131-8
