= Bidi =

Bidi can refer to

- Bidi (settlement), a settlement in the Belgaum district, India
- Bidirectional text or bidi writing, mixing left-to-right and right-to-left scripts
- Beedi or Bidi, a thin, Indian cigarette
- Bidi, a town in the Malaysian state of Sarawak
- Bidi Bidi Refugee Settlement in Uganda
- Bidi River, a river in the Democratic Republic of the Congo
- Bidirectional transceiver, another name for a 1000BASE-BX10 capable device.
