= Green Giant Solar Power Station =

Solar farm in the Democratic Republic of Congo

- Country: Democratic Republic of Congo
- Location: Democratic Republic of Congo
- Coordinates: 04°47′19″S 16°40′04″E
- Status: Proposed
- Construction began: 2025 Expected
- Commission date: H2 2030 Expected
- Owner: Green Giant Solar Consortium
- Operator: Green Giant Solar Consortium Green Giant Solar Power Station (Democratic Republic of the Congo)

Solar farm
- Type: Flat-panel PV

Power generation
- Nameplate capacity: 200 MW: Phase 1; 1,000 MW: Phase 4

A SkyPower Global Green Giant Solar Power Station (French: Centrale solaire géante verte), is a 1,000 MW (1,300,000 hp) solar power station, under development in the Democratic Republic of the Congo. The solar farm is owned and being developed by SkyPower Global headquartered in Canada and the Africa Finance Corporation (AFC), domiciled in Nigeria. The solar farm will be built in phases, with the first phase with generation capacity of 200 MW beginning construction by 2025. The off-taker is Société Nationale d'Électricité (SNEL), the national electricity company of the Democratic Republic of the Congo, under a long term power purchase agreement (PPA).

== Location ==
The power station would be located in the Democratic Republic of the Congo, on land under the control of SkyPower Ergergy (SkyPower Global).

== Overview ==
SkyPower, founded in Canada in 2003 by energy pioneer Kerry Adler as a Canadian independent power producer (IPP) and the Africa Finance Corporation of Nigeria have partnered with each other to jointly develop this solar farm. The 25-year PPA with SNEL was signed in September 2020. The first phase with capacity of 200 MW is expected to go into the construction phase by 2025. AFC is both an equity partner and financier of this project. The construction of the first phase is expected to cost about US$200 million.

== Developers ==
The power station is under development by a consortium comprising SkyPower Global, a Canadian IPP and AFC, a pan-African multilateral development financial institution domiciled in Nigeria. It is expected that the developer/owners will form a special purpose vehicle (SPV) company to own, finance, build, operate and maintain this power station. For descriptive purposes, we will refer to the SPV as Green Giant Solar Consortium.

== Construction timetable ==
If and when financial close is achieved in 2024 as anticipated, it is expected that construction will begin in Q1 2025. A total of four phases are planned, to reach the planned maximum capacity of 1,000 MW. Phases 2, 3 and 4 are expected to be built after Phase 1.

== Other considerations ==
This power station is expected to diversify electricity sources in DRC, where solar power accounted for 20 MW out of a total of 2.9 GW of installed capacity as of December 2022.

== See also ==
- List of power stations in the Democratic Republic of the Congo
