= Australia-Asia Power Link =

Proposed international electricity infrastructure project

Australia–Asia Power Link
- Map of Australia–Asia Power Link

Location
- Country: Australia
- State: Northern Territory

Ownership information
- Owner: Sun Cable

Construction information
- Expected: 2030 (Darwin); ? (Singapore)
- Commissioned: A$35 billion

Technical information
- Capacity: 6 GW

The Australia–Asia Power Link (AAPowerLink) is a proposed electricity infrastructure project that is planned to include the world's largest solar plant, the world's largest battery, and the world's longest submarine power cable. The project is being developed by an Australian company, Sun Cable, and is often referred to by this name.

Initial plans forecast that a new solar farm in the Northern Territory of Australia would produce up to 20 gigawatts of electricity, most of which would be exported to Singapore, and at a later point Indonesia, by a 4,300 km (2,700 mi) 3 GW HVDC transmission line. A large battery would store energy in order to level energy availability as sunlight varies throughout the day. AAPowerLink has been developed by Sun Cable, an Australian company initially backed by Andrew Forrest and Mike Cannon-Brookes. It was projected to begin construction in mid-2023, with operation starting in early 2026 and completion by late 2027, and estimated to add A$8 billion to the economy of the Northern Territory.

The project collapsed in January 2023, after Sun Cable was placed into voluntary administration following a disagreement between Forrest and Cannon-Brookes about the need to put more funding into the venture. In May 2023, a consortium led by Cannon-Brookes' Grok Ventures won the bid to acquire Sun Cable, with the takeover finalised on 7 September 2023. The revised plans involve supplying electricity to Darwin by 2030, and to Singapore a few years thereafter. Eventually the solar farm is intended to produce six gigawatts of power.

== Background ==
Singapore is heavily reliant on natural gas for its electricity production, mostly imported liquid natural gas (LNG). Gas was providing around 95% of its power in 2020, although they had achieved 350 megawatts of solar energy. The following target was 2,000 megawatts by 2030, which is why the government was interested in the project proposed by Sun Cable. As of 2023, Singapore was continuing to aim at diversifying its energy imports and increase its use of renewable sources. In 2026, despite a period of rapid expansion, only around 3% of Singapore's power was produced by solar energy, which including floated installations of solar panels on the city's reservoirs; however, there is a limit on expansion owing to the city-state's small size, dense population, and high energy use, and this source is unlikely to grow beyond 6%.

In order to reach net zero by 2050, the government aimed to import up to around 6 gigawatts of clean energy by 2035, replacing its imports of oil and gas. There were plans to build a regional grid in South-east Asia, meaning that large amounts of solar energy could be sourced from Malaysia and Indonesia, as well as hydro power from Laos and wind power from Vietnam.

The AAPowerLink could provide 25% of Singapore's electricity, reducing Singapore's emissions by up to 6 million tonnes per year. The planned regional Asian grid does not preclude this source being part of the mix for Singapore.

== Project and company history ==
The project was initially called the Australia–Singapore Power Link, as the power line will initially connect those two countries. It was later renamed to Australia-ASEAN, and again to Australia-Asia, as it was also planned to bring electricity to Indonesia. It is often referred to simply as Sun Cable, the name of the project's owner.

Sun Cable intended to secure all financing by late 2023, beginning construction the following year. As of 2021 it was expected to cost A$30 billion (US$22.6 billion). Initial investments came from billionaires Mike Cannon-Brookes and Andrew Forrest.

In July 2019, the project received major project status from the Northern Territory Government, ensuring local support in development and construction. The federal government awarded the same status in July 2020, expediting construction by facilitating coordination and permitting. Singapore had not yet permitted the project, but benefits for it include long-term electricity price stability, the potential to become a hub for trading renewable electricity in the Southeast Asian power grid, and meeting its agreements to cut emissions under the Paris Agreement.

Undersea surveying of the Australian section of the (AAPL) cable route was completed in 2020 by Guardian Geomatics.

A project development agreement was signed between the NT Government and Sun Cable in January 2021, providing for commercial partnership.

An Integrated Project Delivery Team (IPDT) composed of multi-disciplinary international partners was announced in October 2021, including Bechtel (Project Delivery), Hatch Ltd (HVDC Tramission), Marsh (Risk Management), PwC Australia (Project Advisory) and SMEC (Solar Generation System). Construction was projected to require 1,000 jobs, and operation will have 300 jobs in the Northern Territory. As of 2021, it was expected to deliver first supply of electricity to Darwin in 2026, Singapore in 2027 with full capacity by end of 2028.

Australia is the world's largest exporter of coal. The AAPowerLink, along with the proposed wind and solar Asian Renewable Energy Hub in the Pilbara, would make it a "green energy exporting superpower."

=== 2023: Temporary administration ===
In January 2023, Sun Cable went into voluntary administration. The Financial Times reported that the administration was caused after lead investors Forrest and Cannon-Brooks "clashed... over the terms of a new funding round", itself necessitated "since the project started missing milestones".

In March 2022, it was announced that Sun Cable raised A$210m (€139m) Series B capital to fund the continued development of the project. The round was led by Grok Ventures (owned by Cannon-Brookes) and Squadron Energy (owned by Forrest). As of 5 May 2023, a process for the sale of the company has attracted four bidders, including Squadron and Grok. In May 2023, a consortium led by Grok Ventures and including Quinbrook Infrastructure Partners won the bid to acquire Sun Cable. Grok put A$65m into Sun Cable during its period in administration, and the takeover was finalised on 7 September 2023. The project aims to supply electricity to Darwin by 2030 (900 megawatts initially), and to Singapore a few years thereafter. Eventually the solar farm would produce 6 gigawatts of energy.

=== 2024: Conditional approval by Singapore ===
On 22 October 2024, Sun Cable was granted conditional approval by the Energy Market Authority (EMA) of Singapore, to import 1.75 gigawatts (GW) of electricity, generated by solar power, from Australia's Northern Territory to Singapore. The electricity will be transmitted via new subsea cables.

=== 2026: Anthropic data centre ===
In 2026, Anthropic met with Sun Cable over a planned Anthropic data centre in the Northern Territory.

By October 2026, the expected cost of the project had risen to A$35 billion.

== Design ==
The AAPowerLink begins with the development of the world's biggest integrated renewable energy zone, (which includes solar PV generation, energy storage and voltage source converter) on Powell Creek in the Barkly Region of the Northern Territory, using photovoltaic modules designed by Australian company 5B and prefabricated at a proposed factory in Darwin.

The solar panels will cover an area of 12 km × 10 km (7.5 mi × 6.2 mi), or 12,000 ha (30,000 acres), (twice the size of Manhattan) in a region with some of the best solar resources in the world. An 800 km (500 mi) overhead power line will transmit 6.4 GW to Darwin, where it will deliver up to 4GW to a proposed Middle Arm Sustainable Development Precinct in Northern Territory, an industrial precinct for development of industries in renewable energy, critical minerals processing, and other low-to-zero emissions fuels needed for Australian supply chain. From there, it will be transferred to a 4,300 km (2,700 mi) 1.75 GW undersea power line to Singapore, which equates to around a quarter of Singapore's demand. The undersea cable will be the longest undersea cable in the world, exceeding the existing longest undersea power cable by a factor of around five. Batteries at the solar array in Darwin and Singapore will provide load-balancing for continuous daily dispatch.

In September 2021, it was announced that there would be further expansions to the proposed size of the project, from 10 GW to 20 GW capacity, and from 20 GWh to 36-42 GWh of battery storage, with a new estimated construction cost of $30 billion. Forecasts suggest up to $A2 billion in exports, 1750 jobs in construction, 350 operational jobs, and 12,000 indirect jobs will be created across Australia, Singapore and Indonesia over its 70-year operational life.

== Risks ==
There are several risks associated with the project, including:

- Keeping costs low enough to make it worthwhile for Singapore
- Construction difficulties of building the world's longest undersea cable (six times longer than the current longest one)
- Running it through another country's waters (Indonesia)
- Laying it on the seafloor in a volcanically active zone
- Acceptance by Singapore on putting so much reliance on a single source of power
- Increasing costs
- Number of regulatory approvals needed by three countries
- Plans for the south-east Asian grid already in place

However, Puah Kok Keong, CEO of the Singapore Energy Market Authority, which regulates the power and gas industries, said: "I think there's a good chance that [Sun Cable] can still happen. But, as I said, there are challenges that we have to overcome".

== See also ==
- Xlinks Morocco-UK Power Project
- List of HVDC projects
- List of planned renewable energy projects
- Solar power in Australia
- Electricity sector in Singapore
