= Nseke Hydroelectric Power Station =

Hydropower station in the Democratic Republic of the Congo

- Map of DR Congo showing the location of Nseke Hydroelectric Power Station Nseke Hydroelectric Power Station (Africa) Nseke Hydroelectric Power Station (Earth)
- Country: Democratic Republic of the Congo
- Location: Kolwezi, Lualaba Province
- Coordinates: 10°18′15″S 25°24′24″E
- Purpose: Power
- Status: Operational
- Construction began: 1950s
- Opening date: 1956
- Operator: Société Nationale d'Électricité (SNEL)

Dam and spillways
- Impounds: Lualaba River

Power Station
- Commission date: 1956
- Turbines: 4 x 65 MW
- Installed capacity: 260 MW (350,000 hp)

Nseke Hydroelectric Power Station (French: Centrale hydroélectrique de Nseke) is an operational hydropower plant in the Democratic Republic of the Congo, with installed capacity of 260 megawatts (350,000 hp). It is operated by the Congolese electricity utility company, Société Nationale d'Électricité (SNEL).

== Location ==
The power station is located on the Lualaba River, in Lualaba Province, in southeastern DR Congo, close to the border with Zambia. Its location is approximately 69 kilometres (43 mi), north of the city of Kolwezi, the provincial capital. This is approximately 371 kilometres (231 mi), northwest of Lubumbashi, the nearest large city. The geographical coordinates of Nseke Hydroelectric Power Station are: 10°18'15.0"S, 25°24'24.0"E (Latitude:-10.304167; Longitude:25.406667).

== Overview ==
This power station was constructed in the 1950s and commercially commissioned in 1956. The power plant comprises four General Electric turbines, each with generating capacity of 65 megawatts. The power produced is integrated into the national electric grid, by the national electricity utility, SNEL.

Due to the age of the hardware, there have been efforts to refurbish and modernize hardware and operations at the power station, in order to maintain functional efficiency.

== Ownership ==
Nseke Power Station was constructed in the 1950s and commercially commissioned in 1956 to supply power to Générale des carrières et des mines (Gécamines) a DR Congo mining conglomerate, which owns mines in Lualaba Province and in the adjacent Haut-Katanga Province. In 1974, SNEL, the electricity generation, transmission and distribution monopoly took over ownership of the power station, following a presidential decree.

== See also ==
- List of power stations in the Democratic Republic of the Congo
- Africa Power Dams
- World Power Dams
