= Inkisi =

Inkisi may refer to:

- Inkisi (town), a town in the western Democratic Republic of Congo
- Inkisi River, a large south bank tributary of the Congo River
