= Mwadingusha Hydroelectric Power Station =

Power station in the Democratic Republic of the Congo

Mwadingusha Power Station
- Location of Mwadingusha Power Station; Placement on map is approximate Mwadingusha Power Station (Africa) Mwadingusha Power Station (Earth)
- Location: Mwadingusha, Kambove Territory, Haut-Katanga Province
- Coordinates: 10°45′08″S 27°14′38″E
- Construction began: 2017
- Opening date: 2021

Dam and spillways
- Type of dam: Gravity dam
- Impounds: Lufira River

Reservoir
- Creates: Lake Tshangalele
- Surface area: 362 square kilometres (140 mi^{2})

Power Station
- Commission date: 1930 and 2021
- Turbines: Andritz AG: 6 x 13.05 MW
- Installed capacity: 78.3 MW (105,000 hp)

The Mwadingusha Hydroelectric Power Station, also Mwadingusha Power Station is a 78.3 megawatts hydroelectric power station across the Lufira River in the Democratic Republic of the Congo. Originally commercially commissioned in 1930, the six electricity generators were replaced and upgraded from 11.8 MW each, to 13.05 MW each, raising generation capacity from 71 MW to 78.3 MW.

The rehabilitation and upgrade of the power station between 2016 and 2021, was executed by a joint partnership between Ivanhoe Mines, a Canadian mining company and Société Nationale d'Électricité (SNEL), the DR Congolese national electricity utility parastatal company.

Part of the electricity generated here is used by Ivanhoe Mines in its Kamoa-Kakula Copper Mine, an estimated 250 kilometres (155 mi), southwest of the Mwadingusha HPP. The balance of the power is taken up by SNEL and integrated into the national electricity grid.

== Location ==
The power station lies across the Lufira River, in the town of Mwadingusha, Kambove Territory, Haut-Katanga Province, in the extreme southeastern part of the Democratic Republic of the Congo. Mwadingusha is located approximately 72 kilometres (45 mi) northeast of Likasi, the nearest large town. This is about 120 kilometres (75 mi) north of Lubumbashi, the provincial capital and nearest large city.

== History ==
The original Power station was first commissioned in 1930 by Société générale africaine d’électricité, Société générale des forces hydroélectriques du Katanga and the Union Minière du Haut-Katanga. The main purpose was the delivery of energy to the mining sector in Katanga. Power lines of 120 and 50 kV connected the mining towns Likasi, Kolwezi, Lubumbashi and even Kipushi.

The original design included six generators, each rated at 11.8 MW, for total capacity of 71 megawatts. As far back as 2016, SNEL in partnership with Ivanhoe Mines, began updating the Mwadingusha HPP, which and had not had an upgrade since 1930. In the beginning, one generator at a time, was repaired and updated.

The supplier of the original electrical mechanical installations was Charmilles of Switzerland. Under the rehabilitation contact in the 21st century, the engineering, procurement and construction (EPC) contract was awarded to a consortium comprising Andritz AG of Austria and Cegelec of France. Cegelec is a subsidiary of Vinci Energies.

Originally only four of the six electricity generating turbines were targeted for refurbishment. New Francis turbines, each with generating capacity of 13.05 MW, were designed and manufactured in Europe. The work also involved replacing most of the electro-mechanical hardware of the power station, including valves, inverters, voltage regulators, exciters, stabilizers and related equipment.

As the work progressed, in 2017, a decision was made to replace all six generators with new ones. Over time, the scope of work expanded until September 2021, when all six refurbished turbines were fully simultaneously synchronized with the SNEL grid.

== See also ==
- List of power stations in the Democratic Republic of the Congo
- Katende Hydroelectric Power Station
