= Katende hydroelectric power station =

Power station in the Democratic Republic of the Congo

- Map of DR Congo showing the location of Katende Hydroelectric Power Station Katende hydroelectric power station (Africa) Katende hydroelectric power station (Earth)
- Country: Democratic Republic of the Congo
- Location: Katende, Kasaï-Central
- Coordinates: 06°20′48″S 22°27′02″E
- Purpose: Power
- Status: Under construction
- Construction began: 2011
- Opening date: 2025 Expected
- Operator: Société Nationale d'Électricité (SNEL)

Dam and spillways
- Impounds: Lulua River

Power Station
- Turbines: 4 x 16 MW
- Installed capacity: 64 MW (86,000 hp)

Grand Katende hydroelectric power station (4 x 16 MW) is a hydropower plant under construction in the Democratic Republic of the Congo, with installed capacity of 64 megawatts (86,000 hp). When completed, it will be operated by the Congolese electricity utility company, Société Nationale d'Électricité (SNEL).

== Location ==
The power station is located on eastern bank of the Lulua River, a tributary of the Congo River, in Kasaï-Central Province, in south-central DR Congo, close to the border with Angola. Its location is approximately 82.5 kilometres (51 mi), south of the city of Kananga, the provincial capital. This is approximately 258 kilometres (160 mi), by road, southwest of the city of Mbuji-Mayi, in neighboring Kasaï-Oriental Province, the nearest large city. The geographical coordinates of Katende Hydroelectric Power Station are: 06°20'48.0"S, 22°27'02.0"E (Latitude:-6.346667; Longitude:22.450556).

== Overview ==
LoC of US$168 million for the Katende Hydro power Project (64 MW), in the Kasai Occidental Province, was signed on July 11, 2011 and the contract awarded to a consortium on 18th August, 2011 to the Indian company BHEL-AIL Consortium, began construction of the Katende Hydroelectric Power Station, at a contract price of US$280 million. The energy project was intended to supply power to Kananga, Mbuji-Mai and neighboring communities, with initial completion date of 2016. WAPCOS Limited is project management consultant for this project. Ministry of Energy and Water Resources (MOEWR), D R Congo is Owner of the project.

== Delay ==
The Kamwina Nsapu rebellion broke out in August 2016. Sometime in 2017, the contractor stopped work and vacated the construction site. At that time, civil engineering work was 55 percent complete. In early 2021, the government of the Democratic Republic of the Congo began negotiations with the Indian government to restart construction of the dam and associated projects. Selection of a new contractor is under process.

== Associated projects ==
In addition to Katende HPP, the contractor was expected to construct three high voltage evacuation lines. The first one, from the city of Kananga to Mbuji-Mayi, measuring 130 kilometres (81 mi). The second line to run from Kananga to Bunkonde, in Kasai Central, measuring 30 kilometres (19 mi) and the third one will go to mbuji-Mayi via Tshimbulu. Agreement for a LOC of US$109.942 million for Transmission and Distribution Line Project for the evacuation of power from the Katende Hydropower Project was signed on 28th May, 2015.

== See also ==
- List of power stations in the Democratic Republic of the Congo
- Piana–Mwanga Hydroelectric Power Station
- Mwadingusha Hydroelectric Power Station
- Africa Power Dams
- World Power Dams
