= Lubero Airport =

- IATA: none; ICAO: FZNF

Summary
- Airport type: Public
- Serves: Lubero
- Elevation AMSL: 5,906 ft / 1,800 m
- Coordinates: 0°08′20″S 29°14′30″E

Map
- Location of the airport in Democratic Republic of the Congo

Runways
Direction	Length		Surface
Direction	m	ft	Surface
14/32	1,440	4,724	Grass
- Sources: Google Maps GCM

Lubero Airport (ICAO: FZNF) is an airport serving the city of Lubero in North Kivu Province, Democratic Republic of the Congo.

Lubero is in a basin, and the airport has nearby rising terrain to the north, and distant rising terrain in all other quadrants.

== See also ==
- Transport in the Democratic Republic of the Congo
- List of airports in the Democratic Republic of the Congo
