= Bidi River =

River in Democratic Republic of the Congo

Location
- Country: Democratic Republic of the Congo
- Province: Kongo Central

Physical characteristics
- Mouth
  - location: Inkisi River
  - coordinates: 5°27′3″S 15°15′4″E
- Length: 525 m (1,722 ft)

Basin features
- Progression: Bidi River → Inkisi River → Congo River → Atlantic Ocean
- River system: Congo

The Bidi River is a river in Kongo Central, Democratic Republic of the Congo. The river drains into the Inkisi River, the last large tributary of the Congo, which finally drains into the Atlantic Ocean.
