= Western Power Corridor =

The Western Power Corridor (Westcor) was a project to construct and supply energy from two hydroelectric power plants to the Democratic Republic of the Congo, Angola, Namibia, Botswana and South Africa. Originally, the hydro power was to be supplied form the Democratic Republic of the Congo's INGA III project. Later Inga III was supposed to be replaced by Angola's Cuanza River and Cunene River projects or by the new project in the Democratic Republic of Congo.

== History ==
An inter-governmental memorandum on the Westcor was signed on 22 October 2004 in Johannesburg, South Africa, followed by the shareholders' agreement signed by the national electricity companies. The pre-feasibility study was completed in 2005.

In 2009, Democratic Republic of the Congo decided to develop the INGA III project by using private investments and the project was redesigned to involve Cuanza River and Cunene River projects in Angola. In 2010 the Democratic Republic of Congo indicated it will propose a new project involving also Mozambique, Zambia, and Zimbabwe.

Ultimately the project was aborted by shareholders when unforeseen changes were proposed to the founding agreements.

== Technical description ==
The total length of Westcor will be over 3,000 kilometres (1,900 mi) and the capacity will be 3,500 megawatts (4,700,000 hp). INGA III will be connected with the Capanda Power Station in Angola via two 400-kilovolt (kV) high voltage alternating current (HVAC) lines. INGA III will be also connected with Kinshasa via another 400 kV HVAC line. From Angola, two multi-terminal high-voltage direct current systems will run to Namibia, Botswana and South Africa. The system will consist of five converter stations: Kuanza in Angola, Auas in Namibia, Goborone in Botswana, and Omega and Pegasus in South Africa. The expected cost of the project is about € 5 billion.

== Project company ==
The Westcor company was registered and incorporated in Botswana in 2003. The shareholders are Empresa Nacional de Electricidade de Angola, Botswana Power Corporation (BPC), the Société nationale d'électricité (SNEL) of the DRC, Eskom of South Africa and NamPower of Namibia. CEO of the company was Pat Naidoo.
