= Lucie Kamuswekera =

Congolese artist (born 1944)

- Born: 1944 (age 81–82); Lubero, North Kivu, Belgian Congo
- Citizenship: Democratic Republic of the Congo
- Occupations: Textile artist Nurse
- Years active: 1997–present
- Known for: Tapestries documenting the history of the Congo
- Notable work: Congo Belge Rwanda Burundi
- Children: 5

Lucie Kamuswekera (born 1944) is a Congolese textile artist. She is known for her tapestries detailing the history of the Democratic Republic of the Congo from the colonial era through to the present day, with a particular focus on her experiences living in North Kivu, which has experienced significant violence and unrest following the First and Second Congo Wars and the ongoing M23 campaign.

== Personal life ==
Kamuswekera was born in Lubero, a town in North Kivu in what was then the Belgian Congo. Under the colonial education system, she was taught embroidery by Italian nuns while attending a convent school. After finishing her secondary education, Kamuswekera trained as a nurse. She moved to Kibirizi, a village near Butembo, after marrying a trader from there; they had five children together.

In 1997, during the First Congo War, Kamuswekera's husband was kidnapped and tortured by soldiers from the National Congress for the Defence of the People while harvesting, who forced him to burn down the family home; he subsequently died of his injuries. Kamuswekera fled with the children, settling in the city of Goma.

== Embroidery career ==
Kamuswekera had kept up with embroidery as a hobby, primarily stitching flowers. During the Second Congo War, while she was living in Goma, she saw an army truck carrying the bodies of dead soldiers from the Armed Forces of the Democratic Republic of the Congo; Kamuswekera later said that "it is when I saw people die, that I began embroidering the history of Congo". She decided to start documenting Congolese history through tapestries, establishing a small shopfront in the Kyeshero area of Goma, attached to the family home.

Kamuswekera's work has spanned modern Congolese history from the colonial era to the present day. Notable events she has stitched include the assassination of Patrice Lumumba in 1961 in La mort de Lumumba; the actions of the Force Publique in Belgian Congo; and the actions of the March 23 Movement in North Kivu. In Congo Belge Rwanda Burundi, Kamuswekera documented the entire history of the Congo, from the arrival of a Portuguese man in 1482 to the inauguration of Félix Tshisekedi in 2019.

Kamuswekera's tapestries can take weeks to months to complete; she has described it as taking her five days to stitch a single human face. She is supported in her work by her children, grandchildren and great-grandchildren, as well as others she has taught embroidery to. Kamuswekera does not speak French, and so stitches around stencils of words added by her assistants, such as "non à la corruption" (lit. 'no to corruption'). She uses jute found on the street as the base for her tapestries, and makes her own needles out of scrap metal.

Kamuswekera has called out issues in the Democratic Republic of the Congo, including corruption and violence, particularly sexual violence against women during conflict. While she has documented the actions of the M23 movement in her art, Kamuswekera has expressed caution at continuing to do so following M23's occupation of Goma in 2025, citing concerns for her safety.

== Recognition ==
Kamuswekera's work was noted by Congolese journalist Benjamin Kasembe, who subsequently published it on the German news website Deutsche Welle.

In 2023, the Amsab-Instituut voor Sociale Geschiedenis in Ghent held an exhibition of Kamuswekera's art, entitled Embroidered Past, Imagined Future, with support from Amnesty International, Ghent University and Ohio State University. The exhibition was later displayed at Ohio State University's Urban Arts Space in Columbus between September and November 2023. From July to August 2025, Embroidered Past, Imagined Future was again shown in Ghent, at Saint Nicholas Church.
