= List of power stations in the Democratic Republic of the Congo =

The following page is a list of power stations in the Democratic Republic of the Congo. As of December 2015, installed electric generation capacity totalled 2,442 megawatts, but only half that capacity is functioning.

== Hydroelectric ==
=== Operational ===
Station	Capacity (MW)	Type	Community	Coordinates	River	Refs
Inga II Power Station	1,424	Run of river		05°31′44″S 13°37′14″E	Congo River	
Inga I Power Station	351	Reservoir		05°31′01″S 13°37′19″E	Congo River	
Nseke Hydroelectric Power Station	260	Run of river		10°18′15″S 25°24′24″E	Lualaba River	
Ruzizi II Power Station	45	Reservoir			Ruzizi River	
Ruzizi I Power Station	40	Reservoir			Ruzizi River	
Rutshuru Hydroelectric Power Station	13.8	Run of river	Rutshuru	01°13′33″S 29°27′36″E	Rutshuru River	
Mutwanga Hydroelectric Power Station	9.4	Run of river	Mutwanga	00°20′24″N 29°45′36″E		
Mobayi Power Station	22	Reservoir				
Nzilo Hydroelectric Power Station	100	Run of river		10°29′59″S 25°27′45″E	Congo River	Operational
Mwadingusha Hydroelectric Power Station	71	Reservoir		10°44′42″S 27°14′41″E	Lufira River	
Zongo II Hydroelectric Power Station	150	Run of river		04°46′57″S 14°54′22″E	Inkisi River	

=== Under construction or proposed ===
Station	Capacity (MW)	Type	Community	Coordinates	River	Status	Refs
Grand Inga Power Station	40,000	Run of river		05°32′45″S 13°33′25″E	Congo River	Proposed	
Inga III Power Station	4,800	Run of river		05°31′08″S 13°36′25″E	Congo River	Contracting	
Ruzizi III Hydroelectric Power Station	145	Reservoir			Ruzizi River	Under construction	
Ruzizi IV Hydroelectric Power Station	287	Reservoir			Ruzizi River	Under development	
Katende Hydroelectric Power Station	64	Run of river		06°20′48″S 22°27′02″E	Lulua River	Under construction	
Kakobola Dam	10.5				Lufuku River	Under construction	

== Solar ==
Solar power station	Community	Coordinates	Fuel type	Capacity (megawatts)	Year completed	Owner	Notes
Green Giant Solar Power Station	Kwango	04°47′19″S 16°40′04″E	Solar	1,000	2030 (expected)	SkyPower Global	
Kisangani Solar Power Station	Tshopo Province	00°32′44″N 25°07′25″E	Solar	40		Tshopo Provincial Administration	

== See also ==
- List of power stations in Africa
- List of largest power stations in the world
