= Rutshuru Hydroelectric Power Station =

Dam in Rutshuru, North Kivu

Rutshuru Power Station
- Map of the Democratic Republic of the Congo location of Rutshuru
- Country: Democratic Republic of the Congo
- Location: Rutshuru, North Kivu
- Coordinates: 01°13′33″S 29°27′36″E
- Status: Operational

Dam and spillways
- Impounds: Rutshuru River

Reservoir
- Normal elevation: 1,600 m (5,200 ft)

Power Station
- Commission date: December 16, 2015
- Type: Run-of-the-river
- Turbines: 2
- Installed capacity: 13.8 MW (18,500 hp)

Rutshuru Hydroelectric Power Station, also referred to as Rutshuru Hydropower Station, (French: Centrale hydroélectrique de Rutshuru) is a 13.8-megawatt (18,500 hp) hydroelectric power station under construction in the Democratic Republic of the Congo. The plant was finished on December 16, 2015.

== Location ==
The power station is located near the town of Rutshuru, in Rutshuru Territory, North Kivu Province, in eastern Democratic Republic of the Congo. This location lies at an altitude of about 1,600 metres (5,200 ft), on Rutshuru River, in the Virunga Mountains, close to the International borders with the Republic of Uganda and the Republic of Rwanda. Rutshuru lies approximately 75 kilometres (47 mi), by road, north of Goma, the location of the provincial capital.

== Overview ==
Rutshuru Power Station is a run of river, mini-hydropower plant, with planned installed capacity of 12.5 Megawatts. It is one of three mini-hydropower stations planned for construction in Virunga National Park, in North Kivu, in eastern DRC. The other two mini hydropower stations are the planned Lubero Hydroelectric Power Station, and Mutwanga Hydroelectric Power Station, which was commissioned in August 2013.

== Construction costs ==
The Howard G Buffett Foundation, an American philanthropic organization, which provided technical and financial support from the beginning of the project, has committed another US$19.7 million towards the completion of the Rutshuru Hydropower Station. Construction began in December 2013 and commissioning is expected in 2016.

== See also ==
- List of power stations in the Democratic Republic of the Congo
