= Western Green Energy Hub =

Proposed renewable energy hub for the southern coast of Western Australia

The Western Green Energy Hub is a proposed renewable energy hub for the southern coast of Western Australia, Australia consisting of 70 GW of wind and solar capacity. It is estimated to cost $100 billion AUD in construction and be one of the largest energy infrastructure projects in the world. The proposal spans the Nullarbor Plain and aims to generate a volume of clean energy comparable to Australia's entire current power capacity.

== Design ==
It is proposed to be built on a site area of 15,000 km2 in Dundas Shire, South-East Western Australia, on traditional Mirning land on the Great Australian Bight near Eucla, extending towards the City of Kalgoorlie-Boulder, taking advantage of the area's immense wind and solar energy potential with optimal diurnal profile and an estimated 70% utilisation factor.

The Western Green Energy Hub will produce 3.5 million tonnes of green hydrogen, or 20 million tonnes of green ammonia per year for domestic consumption and export, power equivalent to Australia's entire current energy capacity.

== Development ==
Funding will be headlined by an international consortium of InterContinental Energy, CWP Global and Mirning Green Energy Limited.

The project will also be one of the first to define a new model for natural resource and energy companies to partner with First Nations Land Owners, with Mirning Green Energy Limited being a wholly owned subsidiary of the Mirning Traditional Lands Aboriginal Corporation.

A final investment date of 2028 is proposed.

Western Green Energy Hub
- Country: Australia
- Location: Western Australia
- Coordinates: 31°36′29″S 128°48′07″E
- Status: Planned
- Commission date: 2030
- Construction cost: $100 billion
- Owners: Consortium; InterContinental Energy, CWP Global, Mirning People

Solar farm
- Type: Standard PV

Thermal power station
- Primary fuel: Wind energy

Wind farm
- Type: Onshore

Power generation
- Nameplate capacity: 50,000 MW
- Annual net output: 50 GW
