= Cohydro =

State-owned company in the Democratic Republic of the Congo

Cohydro (French: Congolaise des hydrocarbures) is a state-owned company in the Democratic Republic of the Congo that is involved in the import, export and distribution of hydrocarbons derived from crude oil, for commercial and industrial uses. The company was established on 9 August 1999 by governmental decree (Décret-loi 245) in the interest of creating petroleum independence for the DRC.

The head office is located in Kinshasa.

== Operations ==
Cohydro's products include:

- Fuels
- Lubricants
- Asphalt
- Petrochemicals

As of 2007, Cohydro operates service stations in seven cities in the DRC, including six service stations in the Kinshasa area. The company is actively expanding its service station network.

The company is active in the Republic of the Congo and in the Central African Republic, involving water transport of petroleum products using a fleet of 11 barges.

Cohydro is exploring the hydrocarbon potential of the DRC in affiliation with companies such as Royal Dutch Shell and Perenco. There are currently three major active exploration areas, including the coastal basin.
