= Grand Inga Dam =

Proposed hydro power generation complex in the Democratic Republic of the Congo

- Location of the Grand Inga Dam (lower centre), along with other Inga dams

- Location within Democratic Republic of the Congo
- Country: Democratic Republic of the Congo
- Coordinates: 05°32′48″S 13°35′06″E
- Status: Proposed

Power Station
- Installed capacity: 40–70 GW

The Grand Inga Dam (French: Barrage du Grand Inga) is a series of seven proposed hydroelectric power stations at the site of the Inga Falls, in the Democratic Republic of the Congo. If built as planned, the 40–70 GW project would be the largest power station in the world.

== Location ==
The project would be located across the Congo River, approximately 150 kilometres (93 mi) upstream of where the river empties into the Atlantic Ocean. This is approximately 225 kilometres (140 mi) southwest of Kinshasa, the capital and largest city of the DR Congo. This is the site of the Inga Falls and is the location of the 351 MW Inga 1 Hydropower Station and the 1,424 MW Inga 2 Hydropower Station, approximately 40 kilometres (25 mi) upstream of Matadi, the country's largest port.

== Overview ==
The project would involve building a dam across the south of the Bundi River valley where it meets the Congo, then diverting the Congo from above the waterfalls into the north of the valley to create a huge reservoir. It is anticipated that the vertical drop, the volume, and velocity of water flow at this site can support a series of hydroelectric power stations, each with generation capacity ranging from 4 to 8 GW for a total of 40 GW for the whole complex. Inga III Power Station, with capacity of 4.8 GW, would be the first power station in the series to be constructed. The current design allows for the independent development of the different power stations in the series, as well as the phased development of each station. Each of the seven dams could be owned by different investors. Estimates based on International Energy Agency, a global watchdog, say that 600 million people in sub-Saharan Africa have no access to electricity.

The project has been delayed for years. According to José Ángel González Tausz, chairman of AEE Power there are several reasons for that: "Even if the project is one of the best all over the world – it does not have the credibility." He refers to the corruption within DR Congo, a lack of infrastructure, and sluggish development. Other reasons include the conflict in the eastern part of the country and the fact that investors are also "afraid" because the Grand Inga would not show returns for decades.

== Financing ==
The total construction bill for Grand Inga has been calculated to be as high as $80 billion. The World Bank, the European Investment Bank, and the African Development Bank have provided funding for feasibility and environmental impact studies. In 2016, the World Bank cancelled its support for the Grand Inga Project, but reconsidered Inga 3 in 2024. It is expected that the power stations will be developed as a public-private partnership project.

== Recent developments ==
In June 2020, the Government of the Democratic Republic of the Congo resolved to present the project to the regional heads of State and explore the market on the continent for the power generated. They have recruited the African Union and the New Partnership for Africa's Development in their efforts to get the power station built. South Africa has indicated willingness to buy 2.5 GW of the dam's output. Nigeria is interested in buying 3 GW, and the Congolese mines in Katanga Province are interested in 1.3 GW. In January 2025, according to the BBC, the Chinese state-owned firm Three Gorges Corporation has backed out of the project.

== See also ==
- Inga dams
- List of largest power stations in the world
- List of planned renewable energy projects
- List of power stations in the Democratic Republic of the Congo
