= Livingstone Falls =

Series of cataracts on the Congo River in the Democratic Republic of the Congo

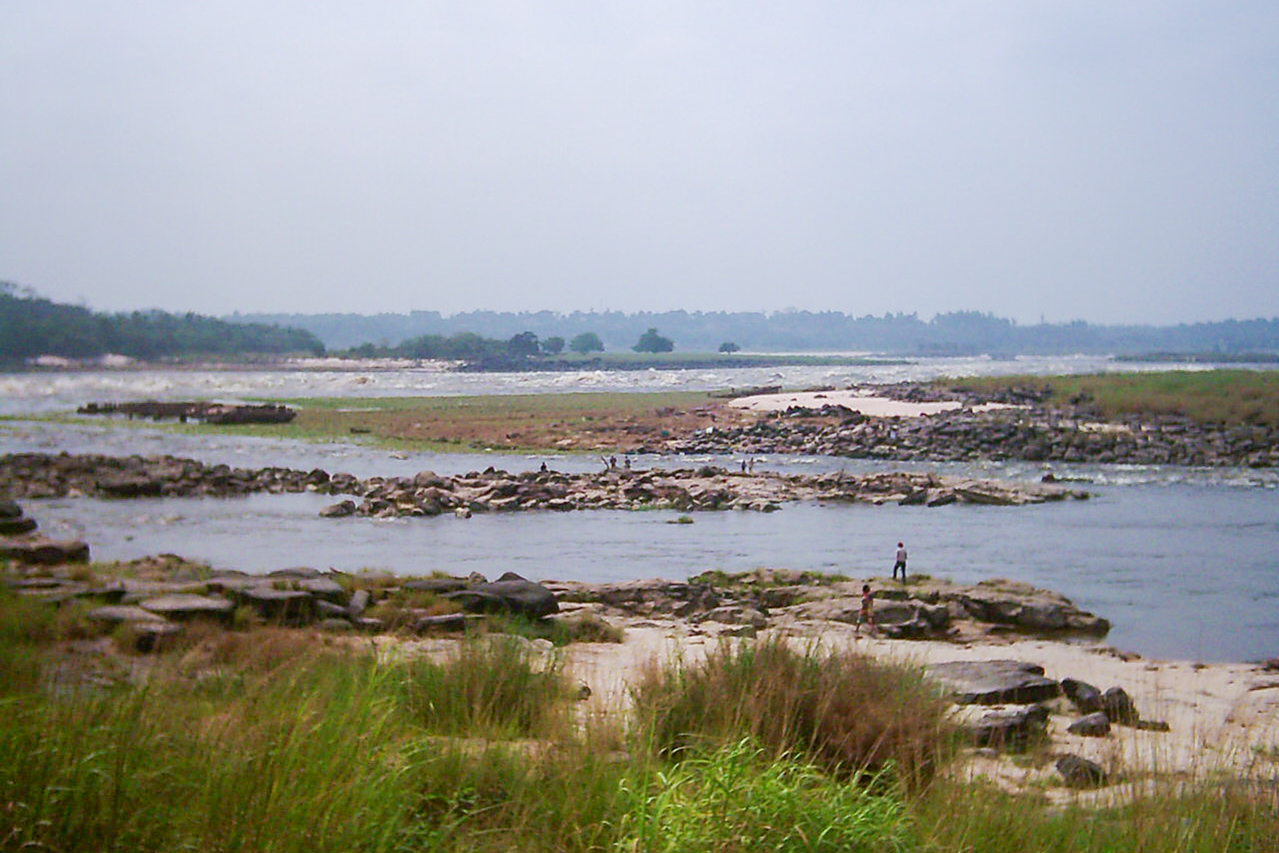
- The beginning of the Livingstone Falls near Kinshasa

- Location within Democratic Republic of the Congo Location within Republic of the Congo Location within Africa
- Coordinates: 4°19′19″S 15°12′28″E

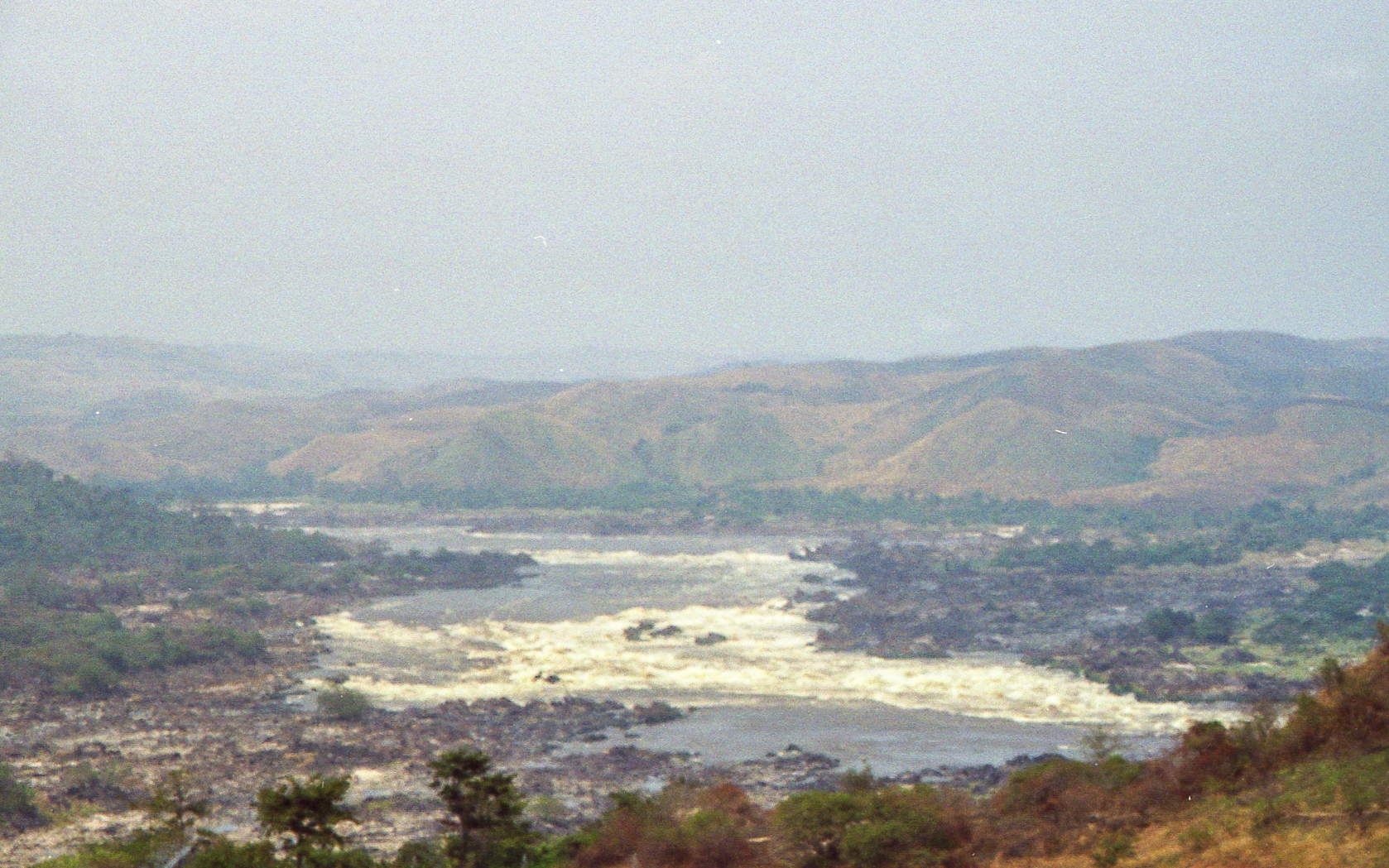
A cataract of Inga Falls

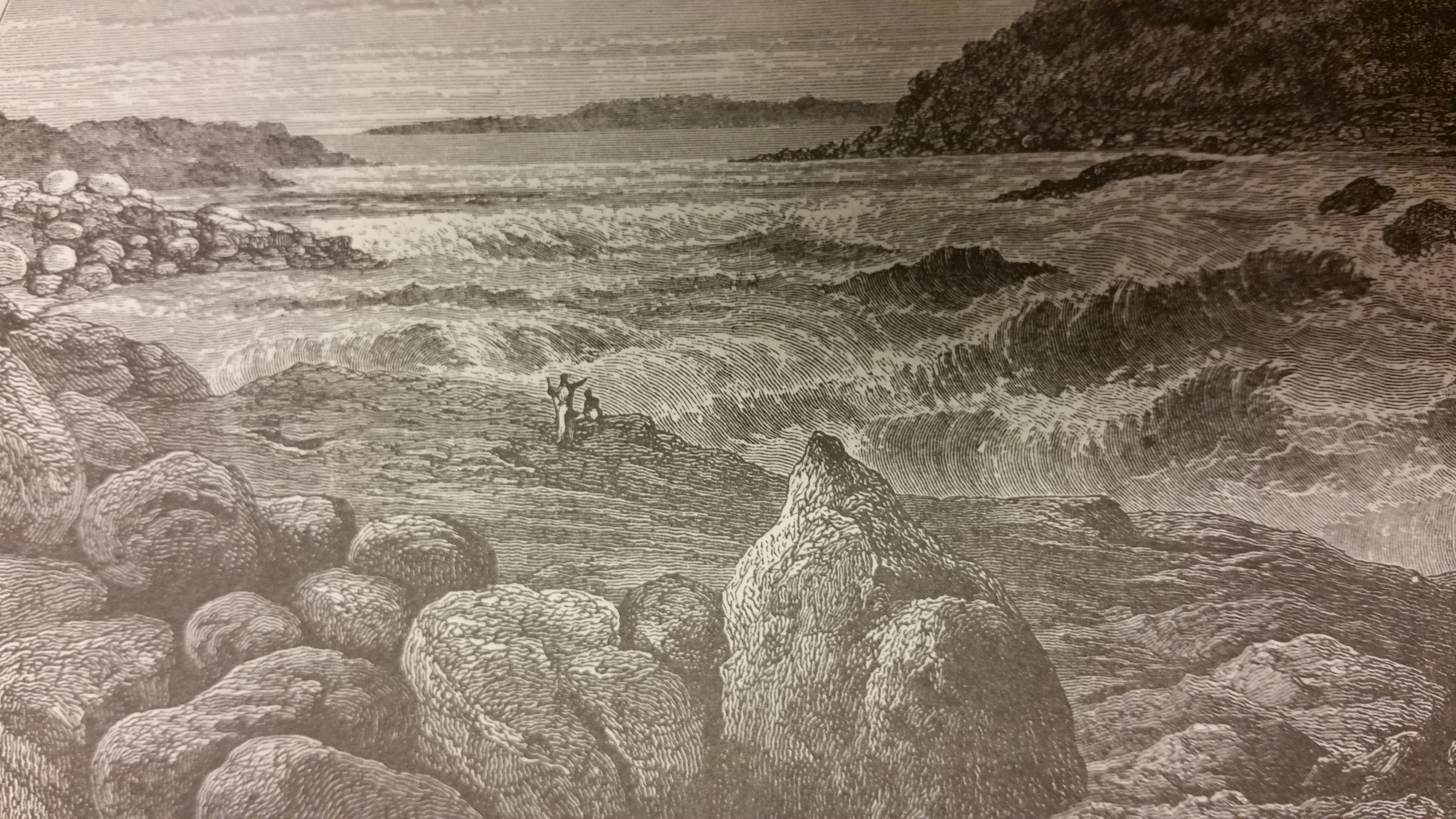
Livingstone Falls as seen by Stanley

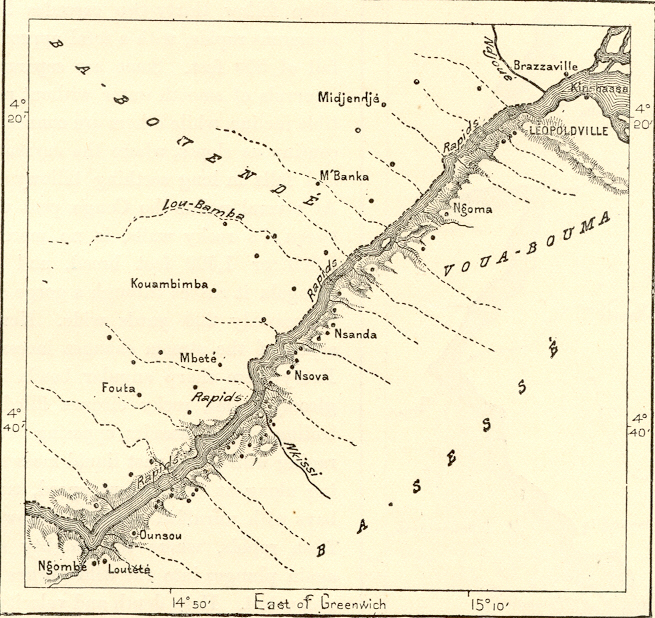
Livingstone Falls map

Livingstone Falls (French: Chutes Livingstone; Dutch: Livingstonewatervallen), named for British explorer David Livingstone, are a succession of enormous rapids on the lower course of the Congo River in west equatorial Africa, downstream from Malebo Pool in the Democratic Republic of the Congo.

== Description ==
Livingstone Falls consist of a series of rapids dropping 270 metres (900 ft) in 350 kilometres (220 mi). They start downstream of Malebo Pool and end in Matadi in Bas-Congo. The Congo River has the second largest flow rate in the world after the Amazon, which has no falls or rapids (except near its sources). The lowest rapids of Livingstone Falls, therefore, are the world's largest waterfall in terms of flow rate — provided one accepts these rapids as being a waterfall. An interesting aspect of the 350-kilometre-long (220 mi) Livingstone Falls is the width of the channel. The channel is very narrow: in several stretches the channel width is less than 300 metres (1,000 ft) and for the majority of the length the channel is less than 800 metres (3,000 ft) wide. This is an extraordinarily narrow channel since the river flow rate typically exceeds 42,000 cubic metres per second (1,500,000 cu ft/s). Investigations in 2008 and 2009 showed that sections between the rapids may be as deep as 200 m (700 ft). The powerful rapids separate fish populations from one another, causing new species to evolve in close proximity to one another.

== History ==
Although he explored the upper Congo, Livingstone never travelled to this part of the river and the falls were named in his honour by Henry Morton Stanley. Stanley described the falls as

"...the wildest stretch of river that I have ever seen. Take a strip of sea blown over by a hurricane, four miles in length and half a mile in breadth, and a pretty accurate conception of its leaping waves may be obtained. Some of the troughs were 100 yards in length, and from one to the other the mad river plunged. There was first a rush down into the bottom of an immense trough, and then, by its sheer force, the enormous volume would lift itself upward steeply until, gathering itself into a ridge, it suddenly hurled itself 20 or 30 feet straight upward, before rolling down into another trough. If I looked up or down along this angry scene, every interval of 50 or 100 yards of it was marked by wave-towers - their collapse into foam and spray, the mad clash of watery hills, bounding mounds and heaving billows, while the base of either bank, consisting of a long line of piled boulders of massive size, was buried in the tempestuous surf. The roar was tremendous and deafening. I can only compare it to the thunder of an express train through a rock tunnel."

Since the falls, which start with the Yellala Falls just above Matadi, are a barrier to navigation on the lower part of the river, the Matadi-Kinshasa Railway was constructed to by-pass them.

== "Grand Inga" proposed hydroelectric project ==
Inga Falls on Congo River is a group of rapids in the latter portion of the Livingstone Falls, 285 kilometres (177 mi) after the Malebo Pool. The Congo falls about 96 metres within this set of cataracts. The mean annual flow rate at Inga Falls is about 42,000 cubic metres per second (1,500,000 cu ft/s). Given this flow rate and the 96-metre (315 ft) fall, it is possible to calculate that the Inga Falls alone has a power potential of approximately 40 GW.

In 2014, Inga Falls was the site of two large hydro-electric power plants and is being considered for a much larger hydro-electric power generating station known as Grand Inga. The Grand Inga project, if completed, would be the largest hydro-electric power generating facility on Earth. The current project scope calls for the use of a flow rate 26,400 cubic metres per second (930,000 cu ft/s) at a net head of 150 metres (490 ft); this is equivalent to a generating capacity of about 38.9 GW. This hydro-electric generator would be almost double the current world record holder, which is the Three Gorges facility at 22.5 GW on the Yangtze River in China.

== See also ==
- List of waterfalls
- List of waterfalls by flow rate
