= Mutwanga Hydroelectric Power Station =

Hydroelectric power station in the Democratic Republic of the Congo

Mutwanga Power Station
- Map of the Democratic Republic of the Congo location of Mutwanga
- Official name: Mutwanga Hydropower Station
- Country: Democratic Republic of the Congo
- Location: Mutwanga, North Kivu
- Coordinates: 00°20′24″N 29°45′36″E
- Status: Operational

Reservoir
- Normal elevation: 1,290 m (4,230 ft)

Power Station
- Commission date: 2013
- Type: Run-of-the-river
- Turbines: 2
- Installed capacity: 9.4 MW (12,600 hp)

Mutwanga Hydroelectric Power Station, also referred to as Mutwanga Hydropower Station, (French: Centrale hydroélectrique de Mutwanga) is a 9.4-megawatt (12,600 hp) hydroelectric power station in the Democratic Republic of the Congo.

== Location ==
The power station is located near the village of Mutwanga, on one of the rivers in Virunga National Park, in North Kivu Province, in eastern Democratic Republic of the Congo. The power station's location lies along the western slopes of the Rwenzori Mountains, close to the International border with the Republic of Uganda. Mutwanga lies approximately 290 kilometres (180 mi), by road, northeast of Goma, the location of the provincial capital.

== Overview ==
Mutwanga Power Station is a run of river, mini-hydropower plant, with installed capacity of 9.4 Megawatts. It is one of three mini-hydropower stations planned for construction in Virunga National Park, in North Kivu, in eastern DRC. The other two mini hydropower stations are the planned Lubero Hydroelectric Power Station, and Rutshuru Hydroelectric Power Station, currently under construction.

== See also ==
- List of power stations in the Democratic Republic of the Congo
- List of hydropower stations in Africa
- List of hydroelectric power stations
