= Inga dams =

Two hydroelectric dams on the Congo River in western DR Congo

Inga Dams
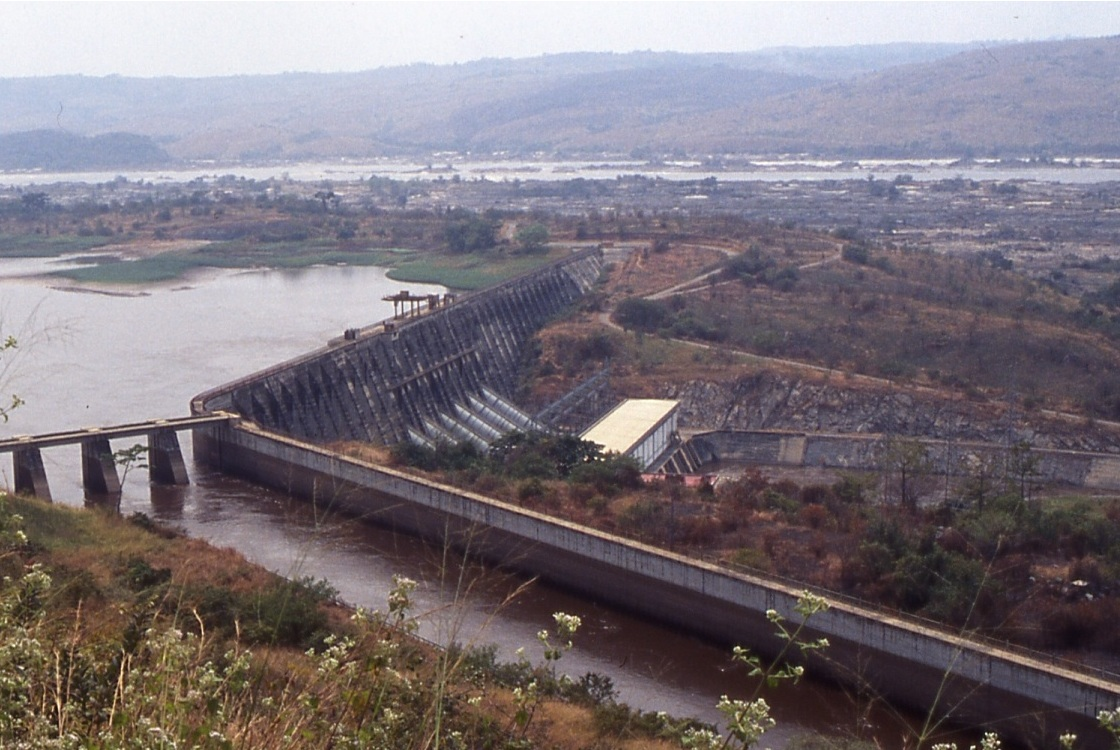
- Inga I dam, with the feeding canal for Inga II in the foreground.

- Location within Democratic Republic of the Congo
- Interactive map of Inga Dams
- Country: Democratic Republic of the Congo
- Coordinates: 5°31′09″S 13°37′19″E
- Status: Operational
- Construction began: Inga I: 1968; Inga II:
- Opening date: Inga I: 1972; Inga II: 1982

Power Station
- Turbines: Inga I: 6 x 58.5 MW; Inga II: 8 x 178 MW
- Installed capacity: Inga I: 351 MW; Inga II: 1,424 MW

The Inga Dams (French: Barrages d'Inga; Dutch: Ingadam) are two hydroelectric dams connected to one of the largest waterfalls in the world, Inga Falls. They are located in the western Democratic Republic of the Congo and 140 miles southwest of Kinshasa.

Inga Falls on the Congo River is a group of rapids (or cataracts) downstream of the Livingstone Falls and the Pool Malebo. The Congo falls ~96 metres (315 ft) within this set of cataracts. The mean annual flow rate of the Congo River at Inga Falls is ~42,000 cubic metres per second (1,500,000 cu ft/s). Given this flow rate and the 96-metre fall, the Inga Falls alone has a potential to generate ~39.6 gigawatts (53,100,000 hp) of mechanical energy and nearly as much electrical energy.

Inga Falls is currently the site of two large hydropower plants and is being considered for a much larger hydro power generating station known as Grand Inga. The Grand Inga project, if completed, would be the largest hydro-electric power generating facility in the world. The current project scope calls for the use of a flow rate ~26,400 cubic metres per second at a net head of ~150 metres; this is equivalent to a generating capacity of ~38.9 GW. This hydro-electric generator would be more than double the current world record holder, which is the Three Gorges Dam on the Yangtze River in China.

Grand Inga is a "run-of-the-river" hydroelectric project in which only a relatively small reservoir would be created to back up the power of the river's flow. This would be so that the net head for the hydroelectric turbines could approach 150 metres.

== History ==
The Belgian colonial government was considering starting what it called "The Inga Scheme" on the eve of decolonization in 1959. Inga I was completed in 1972, and Inga II in 1982.

=== Early study ===
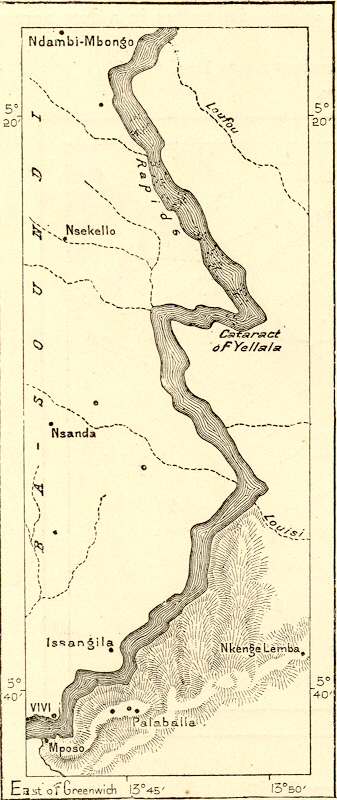
1890s map of the Inga Falls

The hydropower potential of the Congo River was recognized quite early on, at a time when colonial control was expanding over Africa and rivers were first being harnessed to generate electricity. One early report on this potential came via the United States Geological Survey in 1921; their findings concluded that the Congo Basin in its entirety possessed "more than one-fourth of the world’s potential water power". Regarding the Inga Falls location specifically, this was highlighted just four years later by the Belgian soldier, mathematician, and entrepreneur Colonel Van Deuren. He would continue survey work around Inga Falls, and during the 1920s and 1930s there was some movement towards further study of the area's potential by the group Syneba (1929–1939), yet the outbreak of World War II and the dissolution of Syneba put a temporary end to progress on the site.

Atlantropa, a scheme for integrating Europe and Africa conceived by Herman Soergel in the 1920s, included a proposal to dam the Congo River. In this plan, the water would have been used to irrigate the deserts of North Africa, and to generate 22.5 to 45 gigawatts of power.

=== Belgian plan ===
Despite the lack of progress during and in the immediate aftermath of the Second World War, the tantalizing possibilities offered by the Inga Falls remained prominent in engineers' minds. The 1954 book Engineers' Dreams listed a host of massive projects that could theoretically be accomplished (among them the future Channel Tunnel), the largest being an Inga Dam that would create a lake stretching into the Sahara Desert.

Before Congolese independence, the Belgians still harbored the hope of constructing a massive Inga development project to generate electricity for heavy industry. Among those industries discussed were "aluminum, ferro-alloys, the treatment of ores, paper, and a plant for the separation of isotopes." Their vision, at least publicly, was bold, with one authority comparing the potential industrial development in the Congo to the German Ruhr. There was an important American connection to the project in the form of Clarence E. Blee, one of five foreigners on a 10-person study of the Inga site in 1957 and the chief engineer of the United States' foray into federal electrical and industrial development, the Tennessee Valley Authority. This study would play a central role in convincing the Belgian authorities to set an Inga dam in motion.

An Inga scheme, loosely reported as consisting of a "series of power stations and dams", was finally passed by the Belgian Cabinet on 13 November 1957, and a group was slated to be created in order to study the possible uses of the project's electricity and the ways in which to fund it. The Cabinet's plan was estimated at the time to cost US$3.16 billion and was expected to generate 25,000 MW.

A report from late April 1958 stated that excavation work would hopefully begin by midyear, with 1964/1965 as the year set to bring the initial stage to completion. Plans called for three stages of construction, beginning with a 1,500 MW plant with a $320 million price tag, then twice that capacity, and eventually the 25,000 MW originally approved. Industrial development would advance in step, helped by a start price of $0.002 per kwh, producing 500,000 tons of aluminum with the construction of the first plant and eventually aiming for a final production goal six times that. An international syndicate named Aluminga, comprising a number of European and North American firms, was already organizing to realize this. Funding was an issue, especially once the Belgians realized that they could not accomplish such a project alone. Possible investors cited by the press included the International Bank for Reconstruction and Development and the European Investment Bank.

In February 1959 a group of prominent American investors including David Rockefeller visited the Inga Falls, though construction was continually being pushed back from original estimates, then slated for 1961 or later.

Congolese independence from Belgium did not suddenly erase the importance of Inga development. Belgian authorities were still pushing the project while negotiating independence with Congolese delegates, with Minister Raymond Scheyven proposing a joint Congolese-Belgian company that would fund an Inga dam. This was not a minor idea, but the main project in a five-year Congolese development plan he proposed. That advice was apparently not heeded, as newly elected Prime Minister Patrice Lumumba signed a fifty-year contract with the Wall Street-based Congo International Management Corporation to develop the Congo on 22 July 1960, with an Inga project and associated aluminum production at the top of the list. PM Lumumba later backtracked and claimed that the deal was "only an agreement in principle", but regardless he was deposed by Army Chief of Staff Mobutu Sese Seko less than two months later.

=== Inga I and Inga II ===
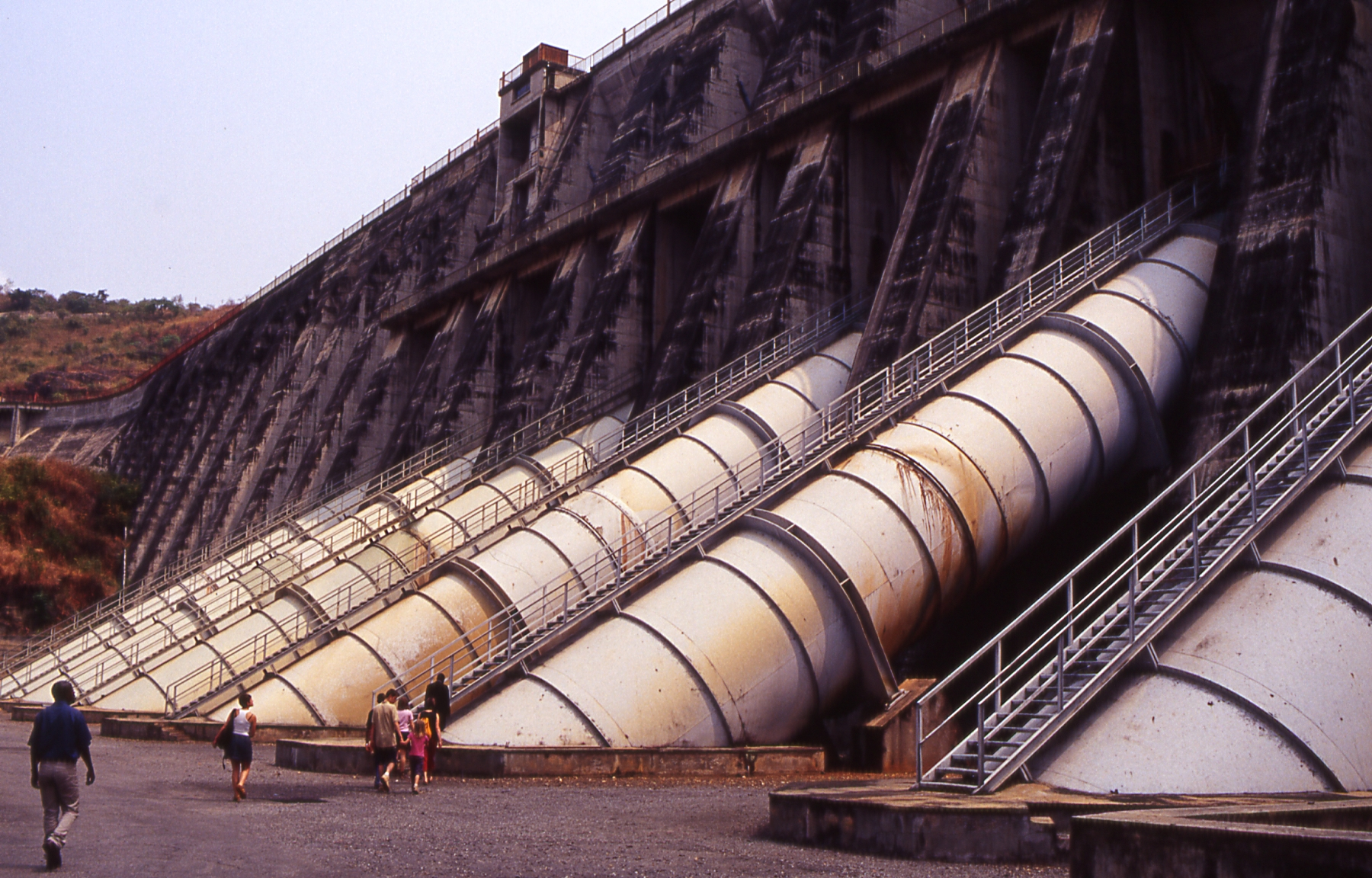
Inga I facility

Despite the ensuing period of instability, rebellions, and UN interventions in the first half of the 1960s, it did not dampen leaders' hopes to harness the rapids of the Congo River. From the wreckage of the Belgian departure and the subsequent turmoil emerged Mobutu Sésé Seko, who seized full power for himself in November 1965 and would remain the Congo's authoritarian president until May 1997. It was during his reign that the first and so far only projects were built to generate power from the Inga Falls.

Inga I was the first project brought to completion. A feasibility study was conducted by the Italian firm SICAI in 1963, which recommended the dam support domestic industrialization as opposed to export focused industry. Funded mainly by the government, construction took place from 1968 to 1972, leaving a six-turbine plant generating 351 MW. This electricity was mainly fed to the populated areas around it and downstream; its successor was explicitly for mining activity in the south.

Inga II was the second hydro project built at the site just south of Inga I. Even with just eight turbines, it was built to produce 1,424 MW, and was completed a full decade after Inga I.

=== Inga-Shaba power line ===
In order to connect the power generating capacity at Inga with the copper and cobalt mines located near the Zambian border in Shaba Province (now Katanga), a new project aimed to build the longest high-voltage direct current power line in existence, bypassing local communities and converting into alternating current at its final destination. The various groups involved had economic as well as political agendas; while Western investors and the Congolese government wished to support the Shaba mines during a period of elevated copper prices, the government also wanted to consolidate its power over the secessionist southern province, and the West had an interest in seeing the Congo stay firmly in the anti-communist camp. The cost for the project was constantly revised upward, eventually reaching $500 million over budget. A mix of private and public groups provided the financing, notably Citibank, Manufacturers Hanover Trust, and the U.S. Export-Import Bank, and it was the storied Boise, Idaho-based company, Morrison-Knudsen, that was contracted to do the work.

In 1980, the costs of the Inga-Shaba power line totaled 24% of Congo's debt, which along with corruption, other wasteful spending, and bad decision-making, led to a debt crisis and the intervention of foreign experts. As of 1999, Congo still owed the U.S. Export-Import Bank over $900 million, leaving American taxpayers unpaid. As the Inga-Shaba line neared completion in the early 1980s, many news articles poured scorn on the project. One from the Washington Post juxtaposed its failure with a successful Peace Corps project to improve the Congolese diet, noting that, "the grandiose project has so far turned out to be a white elephant, while the low-key fish-farming endeavor has already made visible improvements in the lives of several thousand people in a similar period of time." Gécamines, the state-owned mining company in Shaba that was founded in 1906 by the Belgians, ended up still mainly using hydroelectricity supplied locally, and thus the Inga-Shaba line found itself being used at a mere third of capacity. Furthermore, the structure itself has been degraded as local peoples have used its metal bars for a variety of domestic needs.

== Current dams ==
Inga dam projects, as of 2006.

The two hydroelectric dams, Inga I and Inga II, currently operate at a low output. Inga I has a total installed capacity of 351 MW and Inga II has 1424 MW. They were built under former president Mobutu Sese Seko as part of the Inga–Shaba project.

=== Rehabilitation ===
The DRC has faced the problem of rehabilitating the two existing dams, which have fallen into disrepair and operate far below original capacity at roughly 40%, or just over 700 MW combined. In May 2001 Siemens was reportedly negotiating with the government over a billion-dollar partnership that would involve restoration and modernization of the DRC's electrical grid, including the rehabilitation of the two existing Inga power plants, though work was delayed. In mid-2003 there was also a report that the World Bank had signed a $450 million contract with Siemens to improve water and electrical distribution in the DRC, including rehabilitation of the two Inga projects (reported at the time to be at 30% capacity) and a second electrical line from Inga to the capital. It is unclear what transpired concerning these contracts.

Separately in May 2005 the Canadian company MagEnergy signed an agreement with SNEL to rehabilitate some of Inga II's turbines, with a completion goal of 2009. Actual work to rehabilitate Inga II finally began 27 April 2006, just under a year after the initial agreement with MagEnergy was signed. This first phase, which involved fixing a single 168 MW turbine and other emergency repair work, was reported 90% complete in April 2009, and the second phase (four other turbines) was estimated to take five additional years. However, there is doubt over whether the government accepts the validity of the contract, and in the meantime the Canadian company First Quantum was hired to rehabilitate two separate Inga II turbines. To carry out the repairs, the SNEL has received funding from the Regional and Domestic Power Markets Development Project, which is itself supported by the World Bank, African Development Bank, and European Investment Bank.

In August 2021, media reports indicated that Société Nationale d'Électricité (Snel), the national electricity company of the Democratic Republic of the Congo and Ivanhoe Mines Energy DRC, a subsidiary of the Canadian mining conglomerate, Ivanhoe Mines, agreed for the latter to rehabilitate turbine number 5 on the eight-turbine Inga II power station. This will provide 162 megawatts to be consumed by the Kamoa-Kakula Copper Mine, near the city of Kolwezi, in Lualaba Province, in the south of DRC. The work will include the rehabilitation of the Inga–Kolwezi High Voltage Transmission Line.

== Expansion plans ==
Official projections for Inga III and Grand Inga, as of 2006.

There are expansion plans to create a third Inga dam, Inga III. Projections indicate that once completed, Inga III would generate 4,500 MW of electricity. Inga III is the centerpiece of the Westcor partnership which envisions the interconnection of the electric grids of the Democratic Republic of the Congo (DRC), Namibia, Angola, Botswana, and South Africa. The World Bank, the African Development Bank, the European Investment Bank, bilateral donors, and the southern African power companies, have all expressed interest in pursuing the project which is estimated to cost US$80 billion.

One enthusiastic backer of Inga development has been South Africa. In July 1999, newly elected South African President Thabo Mbeki gave a speech to the Organisation of African Unity, highlighting development of the Inga Falls for hydropower as an example of necessary development of Africa's economic infrastructure. For South Africa's public utility Eskom, Inga fit into a broader plan to turn an interconnected African grid into an electricity-exporting powerhouse, eventually supplying Europe and the Middle East. In 2002 Inga was highlighted by the AU's New Partnership for Africa's Development (NEPAD) and Eskom was reported to be investigating a $6 billion run-of-the-river type Inga project which would be developed by an Eskom and Hydro-Québec-led consortium of national utility companies.

Such a consortium, dubbed the Western Power Corridor (Westcor) was finally organized in February 2003. Involving five of the region's major utility companies (Eskom, SNEL, Angola's Empresa Nacional de Electricidade, Namibia's NamPower, and the Botswana Power Corporation) it projected initial costs at $1.5 billion and the eventual construction of a 44,000 MW run-of-the-river project. A memorandum of understanding for Westcor was finally signed on 22 October 2004, for the construction of a 3,400 MW Inga III. The following February Eskom unveiled a new $50 billion run-of-the-river scheme. That September 2005 a shareholder agreement for Westcor was signed, giving each party 20%.

The DRC appeared to move away from the regional development approach offered by Westcor and instead manage the construction of Inga III on its own. In June 2009 it opened bidding for a $7 billion, 4320 MW Inga III project. Snubbing Westcor, the DRC chose BHP, which intended to use 2,000 MW for itself, notably for an aluminum smelter.

In 2017 proposals were for a 10–12 GW dam, up from 4.8 GW in earlier plans, with potential completion sometime after 2024. In October 2018, the government of the DRC announced the signing of contracts with a Sino-Spanish consortium to launch design studies for the construction of the Inga III dam with 11,000 MW and a total cost of $14 billion. Main companies of the consortium were China Three Gorges Corporation, Sinohydro and ACS Group. While construction plans for phase III were reported in be on track in late 2019, a major potential member of a construction consortium, Spanish firm ACS Group, dropped out in January 2020, leaving uncertainty with remaining Chinese and German partners.

=== Grand Inga ===
The Grand Inga Dam, if harnessing much of the power of the river, could generate up to 39,000 MW – and would significantly boost the energy available to the African continent at a cost of more than $80 billion. Connecting Inga to a continent-wide electricity grid for main population centers would cost $10 billion more (est. 2000), and would be the world's largest hydroelectric project. Critics contend the huge amounts of money required for the project would be better spent with smaller scale, localized energy projects that would better meet the needs of Africa's poor majority. A study from Oxford University supports this cautious approach by showing that the average cost overrun for 245 large dams in 65 countries across six continents is 96% in real terms.

The New Partnership for Africa's Development, with significant involvement of South African electric power company ESKOM, suggested in 2003 to start the Grand Inga project in 2010. At an installed capacity of 39,000 MW, the Grand Inga Dam alone could produce 250 TWh annually, or a total of 370 TWh annually for the whole site. By comparison, in 2024 Congo's total electricity production was 13.6 TWh. In 2005, Africa's annual electricity production was 550 TWh (600 kWh per capita).

The project is expected to top US$100 billion in total development costs. In May 2016 construction looked as if it would begin within several months. However, in July 2016 the World Bank withdrew its funding following disagreements over the project despite power purchase agreements from South Africa and mining companies. The first phase grant would have totaled US$73.1 million.

Some observers are skeptical of the project, citing its high cost in a country known for its endemic corruption—risking little benefit to the population.

== Africa's electric energy disparity ==
Africa produces a very low amount of electric energy per capita compared to other regions of the world. Projects such as the Grand Inga Dam, which can generate 43.5 GW, can help solve Africa's electricity shortage. In 2005, South Africa and North Africa produced 70% of the 550 TWh (63 GW) electric output of the continent.

South Africa: 230 TWh p.a. / 26.2 GW (4500 kWh p.a. per capita / 513 W per capita)

North Africa: 150 TWh p.a. / 17.1 GW (1000 kWh p.a. per capita /114 W per capita)

Sub Saharan Africa (South Africa excluded): 170 TWh p.a. / 19.4 GW (250 kWh p.a. per capita / 29 W per capita)

There is speculation that the Grand Inga Dam can produce enough electricity for the whole continent. That was true before the 1990s. The continent has annual economic and population growth respectively of 5% and 2.5%. In 2005, electricity usage was 600 kWh per capita for the 910 million Africans. The region with chronic power shortages is Sub Saharan Africa (South Africa excluded), where production was only 250 kWh per capita for 700 million people. An African average of at least 1000 kWh per capita requires a total continental production of more than 1000 TWh p.a. / 120 GW. This is equivalent to three times the maximum capacity of Grand Inga Dam. The world average per capita was 3044 kWh in 2012 (The World Bank: 2014 The Little Data Book).

According to some, Grand Inga would be too large a proportion of the African demand (43.5 GW combined output compared to a load of 63 GW) to be a practical power source without interconnection by a wide area synchronous grid for example, as well as other power grids. Any large-scale failure of the dam, or its connections to the grid, such as the 2009 Brazil and Paraguay blackout (17 GW), or the 2009 Sayano–Shushenskaya power station accident in Siberia (6.4 GW), would plunge large parts of Africa into a power failure with potentially serious consequences. The Siberia failure, for example, had a disastrous effect on local aluminium smelters. By this argument, full utilization requires interconnection with Europe, so that power to Europe can then be back fed to Africa. This increases the stability of both systems and reduces overall costs.

Three international consortia are bidding for the contract to build the dam, known as Inga III, and to sell the power it generates, estimated at 4,800 MW. This is nearly three times the power produced from Inga's two existing dams, which are decades old and have been crippled by neglect because of government debt and risk-averse investors. The World Bank said, under the current plan, South Africa would buy 2,500 MW from Inga III, and another 1,300 MW would be sold to Congo's power-starved mining industry. The remaining 1000 megawatts would go to the national utility SNEL, helping provide power to an estimated 7 million people around Kinshasa, Congo's capital, and covering all the projected unmet electricity needs there by 2025.

== See also ==
- List of largest power stations in the world
- List of run-of-the-river hydroelectric power stations
