= Inga Falls =

Cataract on the Congo River in the Democratic Republic of the Congo

- Chutes d'Inga (French); Watervallen van Inga (Dutch)
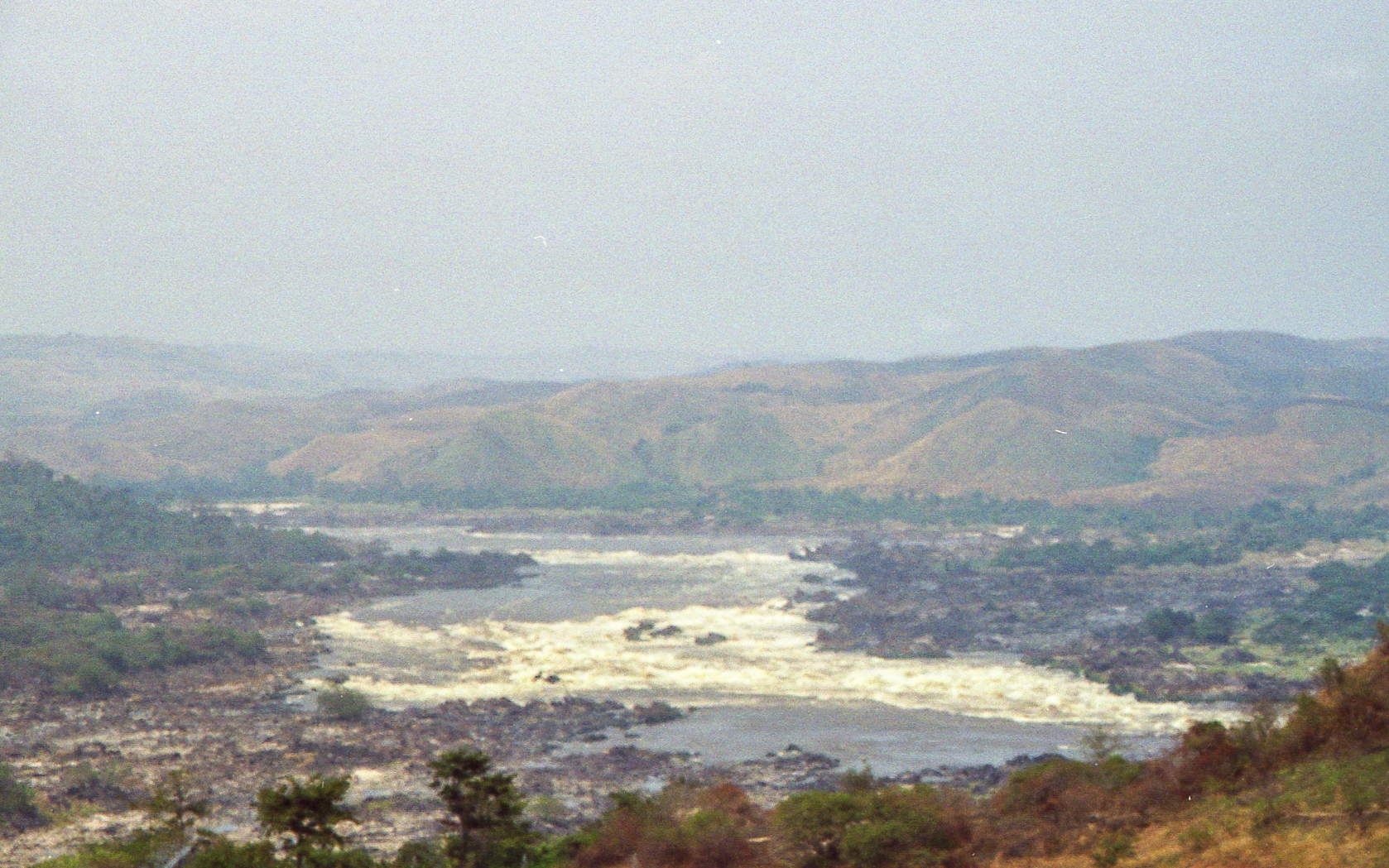
- Interactive map of Inga Falls
- Location: Matadi; Democratic Republic of the Congo
- Coordinates: 5.448835°S 13.588362°E
- Type: Segmented Rapids
- Total height: 96 metres (315 ft)
- Longest drop: 21 metres (69 ft)
- Average width: 910 metres (3,000 ft)
- Watercourse: Congo River
- Average flow rate: 26,000 m^{3}/s (910,000 cu ft/s) (est.)

Inga Falls is a rapid 40 kilometres (25 mi) from Matadi in the Democratic Republic of the Congo where the Congo River drops 96 metres (315 ft) over the course of 15 kilometres (9.3 mi). The falls are part of a larger group of rapids in the lower Congo River. Livingstone Falls are located upstream closer to the Pool Malebo. These falls have formed in a sharp bend of Congo River where the width of river fluctuates from more than 4 kilometres (13,000 ft) to only 260 metres (850 ft).

With a median discharge of 42,000 cubic metres per second (1,500,000 cu ft/s), the falls could be considered the largest in the world, but it is not widely considered to be a true waterfall. Its maximum recorded volume is 71,000 cubic metres per second (2,500,000 cu ft/s). Inga falls is also the site of two large hydroelectric dams, named Inga I and Inga II, as well as two projected dams, Inga III and the Grand Inga Dam, the latter of which would be the largest (by power production) in the world.

== See also ==
- List of waterfalls
- List of waterfalls by flow rate
