= Australian Renewable Energy Hub =

Planned renewable energy plant in Western Australia

The Australian Renewable Energy Hub, formerly Asian Renewable Energy Hub (AREH), is a proposal to create one of the world's largest renewable energy plants in the Pilbara region of Western Australia. After several revisions of the original project concept, in January 2023 the Government of Western Australia approved a revised set of seven projects, totalling 26 GW of wind and solar capacity that would be used to produce green hydrogen, to be exported by converting it to ammonia.

== History ==
The Asian Renewable Energy Hub was first proposed in 2014, with plans for the project concept changing several times since then. The project initially aimed to supply power via an undersea power cable (to Indonesia and perhaps on to Singapore) with a capacity of 15 gigawatts (GW), using four cables, each 3,000 km (1,900 mi) long. However, having explored the potential of exporting green hydrogen via the manufacture of ammonia, it was able to aim for an extra 11GW. The Government of Western Australia gave environmental approval for phase one of the project (15,000 megawatts (MW) of power generation, across 6,500 km^{2} (2,500 sq mi) in October 2020.

Given the status of "major project" by the federal government in October 2020, the proposed development of the plant enables the goals set under the Western Australian Renewable Hydrogen Strategy to be brought forward from 2040 to 2030.

After a revised proposal was submitted to the Australian Government, in June 2021 Minister for the Environment Sussan Ley ruled this plan unacceptable owing to its potential impact on threatened migratory species and internationally significant wetlands in the area. Eighty Mile Beach is a RAMSAR listed site which provides habitat for several threatened species of migratory birds and a large population of waterbirds, which would be disrupted by the marine components of the project, which would affect tidal movements. The consortium continue to work on the environmental impact plans and mitigation measures.

As of June 2022, the project developers BP, Intercontinental Energy, CWP Global, Vestas, and Pathway Investments were planning to build a mixture of wind power and solar energy power generators which would generate up to 26GW of power.

In January 2023, Western Australia approved a land allocation for a revised set of seven projects, renamed the Australian Renewable Energy Hub, which total 26 GW of wind and solar capacity that would be used to produce hydrogen and ammonia. BP bought a 40.5% stake in the project in 2022.

The project partners at the start of 2025 were BP (63.57 per cent), InterContinental Energy (26.39 per cent) and CWP Global (10.04 per cent), but in July BP withdrew from the project, leaving its future unclear.

== Location and description ==
Located in the Pilbara region of Western Australia, up to 1,743 wind turbines of 290 metres (950 ft) in height would be accommodated in 668,100 hectares (1,651,000 acres) of land, and 18 arrays of solar panels each generating 600 megawatts would cover 1,418 hectares (3,500 acres). It is to be located in the Shire of East Pilbara, about 30 km (19 mi) inland from 80 Mile Beach, with the nearest settlement on the map being Mandora Station. The total size of the scheme would be about 666,030 ha (1,645,800 acres).

The plant would use the electricity generated by the wind turbines and solar power to extract hydrogen from water. The hydrogen is then mixed with nitrogen extracted from the air to produce ammonia. The ammonia is easily transported using tankers, and opens up the possibility for more markets around the world.

For the ten years of project construction, the project is expected to create 5,000 jobs, with about 3,000 ongoing jobs anticipated over its 50-year lifetime. It is planned to create a coastal town campus between Port Hedland and Broome, and desalination plants will provide most of the water supply needed for both human consumption and plant cooling purposes.
