= Inkisi River =

River in Democratic Republic of the Congo

Inkisi River Swahili: Mto Inkisi
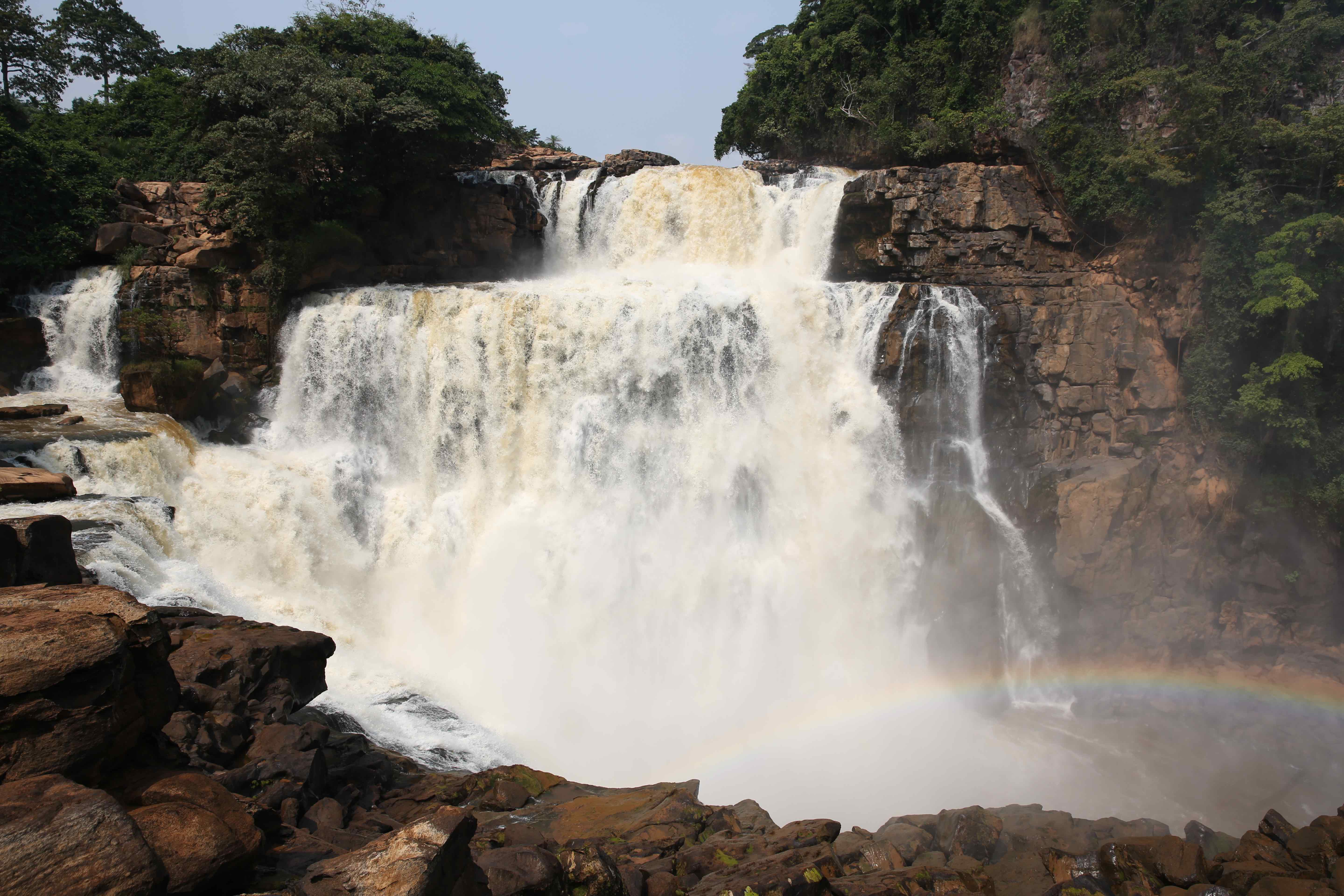
- Zongo Falls on the Inkisi river

- Location within Democratic Republic of the Congo

Physical characteristics
- Mouth: Congo River
  - location: Zongo
  - coordinates: 4°45′50.76″S 14°52′8.73″E

The Inkisi River (Swahili: Mto Inkisi, French: Rivière Inkisi) is the last (closest to the rivermouth) of the larger tributaries of the great Congo River, being the first south bank (left side) tributary, located in Western Central Africa.

The township of Zongo is situated close to the confluence with the Congo River, where there is a hydro power plant and a bridge.
