= Société Nationale d'Électricité =

- Abbreviation: SNEL
- Headquarters: 2831, Avenue de la Justice; BP 500 Kinshasa / Gombe; Democratic Republic of the Congo
- Coordinates: 4.317431°S 15.276462°E
- Services: Electricity
- Website: snel.cd (archived)

Société Nationale d'Électricité (SNEL) is the national electricity company of the Democratic Republic of the Congo. Its head office building is located in the district of La Gombe in the capital city, Kinshasa. SNEL operates the Inga Dam facility on the Congo River, and it also operates thermal power stations.
