= Théodore Nilis =

Belgian soldier and colonial official

Théodore Victor Edouard Adolphe Arthur Nilis
- Born: 27 June 1851; Brilow, Westphalia, Kingdom of Prussia
- Died: 23 April 1905 (aged 53); Ixelles, Belgium
- Occupations: soldier and colonial official

Théodore Victor Edouard Adolphe Arthur Nilis (27 June 1851 – 23 April 1905) was a Belgian soldier and colonial official.

== Early years (1851–1881) ==
Théodore Victor Edouard Adolphe Arthur Nilis was born in Brilow, Westphalia, Kingdom of Prussia on 27 June 1851. His parents were Adolphe Nilis, a Belgian, and Amélie Hesse. On 1 October 1879 Nilis enrolled in the Military School, and on 8 April 1872 he was named sub-lieutenant. He entered the War School in 1875, and three years later graduated with a brevet d'état-major.

== First tour in the Congo (1881–1883) ==

Nilis resigned from the army in February 1881, but was reinstated a few months later so he could serve in Africa for the Comité d'Etudes du Haut-Congo. He embarked at Liverpool on 1 February 1882, accompanied by Captain Edmond Hanssens and Lieutenant Nicolas Grang. They arrived at Banana on 12 March 1882. Nilis was appointed second in command at the Manyanga post, where Lieutenant Victor Harou was commander. When he arrived in Vivi he heard that Anthony Swinburne was being threatened by the local people at Isangila. Émile Parfonry was head of the Isangila station. Nilis, Louis-Gustave Amelot and Joseph Vandevelde brought reinforcements to Isangila. They found the reports had been exaggerated, and sailed upstream in the Royal to Manyanga. When they arrived there Nilis fell ill, but quickly recovered.

On 20 April 1882 Harou was ordered by Stanley to return to Europe. His engagement was until August, but the hardships of his station at Manyanga-Nord were too much for his health. He handed over his command to Nilis. The situation in Manyanga was disturbed. The Zanzibari troops were treating the country as though it had been conquered. The local Bakongo people blamed their excesses on the Belgians, and there were frequent conflicts. On 27 April 1882 Nilis was told that 300 Bakongo were marching against Manyanga. Hanssens was informed at once and although sick left Isangila with reinforcements. Calm was restored, but on 19 August there was an insurrection at N'tembo Motaka. Hanssens, Nilis and Charles Callewaert intervened and quickly restored order. The chief agreed to accept the protectorate of the International Association of the Congo.

At the start of September the scientific expedition of Eduard Pechuël-Loesche was attacked in Mowa. Callewaert led troops from Manyanga and Grang led others from Léopoldville to reinforce Nilis and restore order. A few days later the people of Bandanga rose up, but Nilis managed to make them submit. Nilis fell ill and became bedridden. The local people heard this and decided to starve out the station, but a reinforcement column from Léopoldville intimidated them and made them resume supplies to Manyanga. In October 1882 Henri Avaert was assigned toManyanga under the command of Nilis. He fell ill, but was treated with a combination of morphine and quinine by the Reverend William Holman Bentley of the Baptist Missionary Society, and was able to return to Isangila on the Royal. He later told Coquilhat that his life had been saved by these injections.

In February 1883 Henry Morton Stanley visited Manyanga. He complimented Nilis on the improvement he had made to the station. He had built large brick houses, cleared large areas around the post and planted bananas, cassava and sorgum. His troops were well trained. After a tornado hit the Isangila station, Lieutenant Parfonry was struck by sunstroke while inspecting the damage and was brought to Manyanga for treatment, where he died shortly after Lusick had committed suicide to escape the pain of a disease. Around the same time Nilis heard that Lieutenant Grang had died of a bilious fever in Léopoldville. When Louis Valcke arrived at Manyanga on an inspection tour he found Nilis so depressed by the recent deaths that he sent him down to the coast to rest for a few weeks. Nilis was in Luanda when Willem Frans Van Kerckhoven arrived there, and the two travelled to Vivi together. Nilis returned to Manyanga on 20 August 1883. The arrival of the Protestant mission of Thomas J. Comber and William Holman Bentley and the Catholic mission of Father Georges Kraft had considerably improved the situation, but Stanley saw that Nilis was exhausted and told him to return to Europe. He embarked at Banana on 7 December 1883.

== Regimental duties (1883––1893) ==
Nilis spent four years in Europe. On 19 March 1888 he joined the service of the Congo Free State. He reached Banana on 20 April 1888 and was put in charge of repatriating Zanzibaris and Blacks from the Bas-Congo. He brought them back to Zanzibar on 18 June 1888 and left on 3 July 1888, returning to Europe on 24 July 1888. Nilis returned to his regiment and was appointed tutor of applied mathematics, topography and artillery courses at the Ecole Militaire. In March 1889 he was appointed 2nd captain and adjutant to the 6th line regiment, and on 26 June 1892 he was promoted to captain-commander.

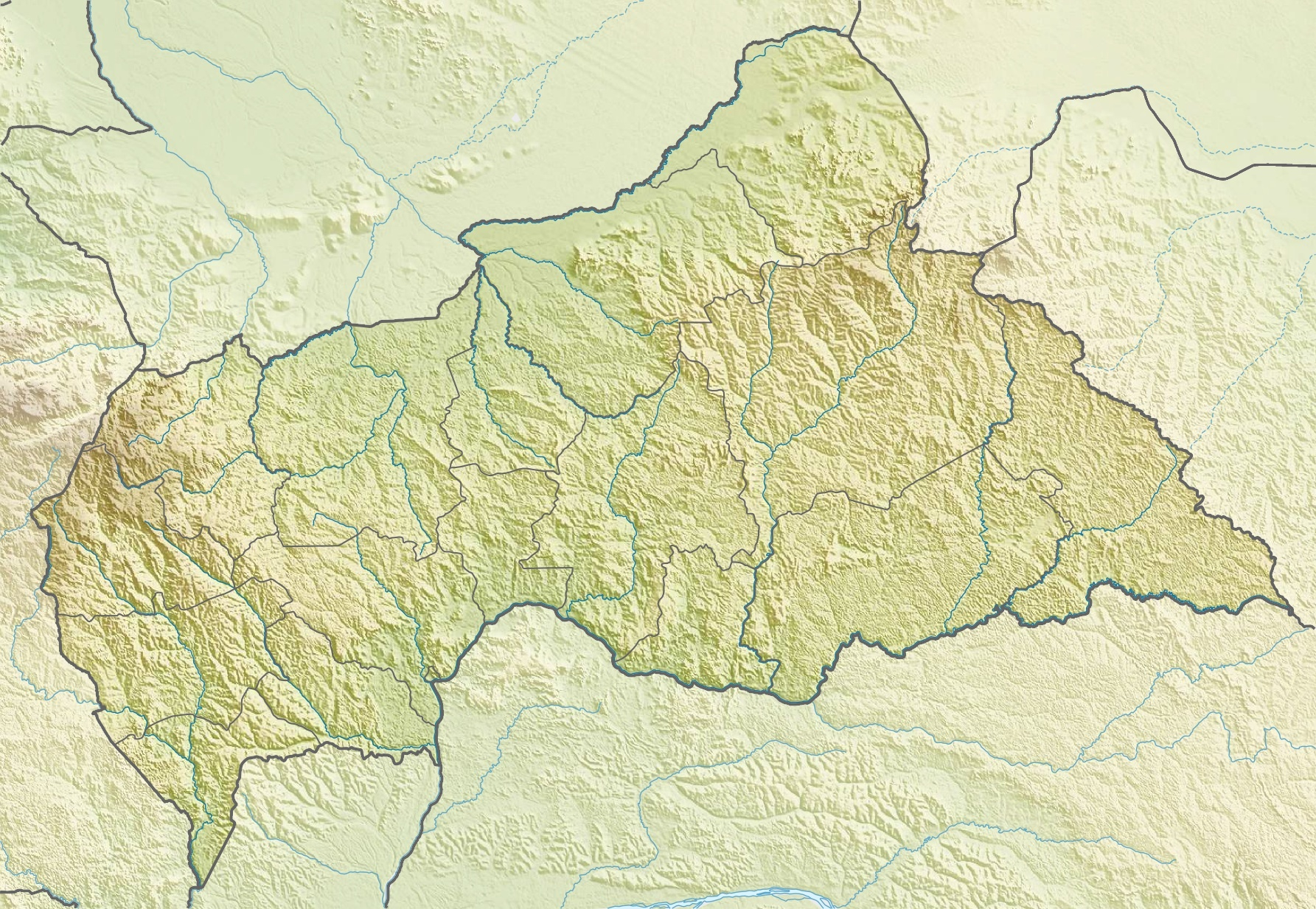

== Ubangi–Mbomou Expedition (1893–1895) ==
On 6 July 1893 Nilis returned to the Congo as 1st class captain commander of the Force Publique. He was attached to the Ubangi-Mbomou expedition under State Inspector Georges Le Marinel. He reached Yakoma on 5 November 1893. In mid-December he was assigned to lead a reconnaissance expedition to Dār Fertit, with lieutenants Charles de la Kethulle, Gérard and Gonze as his deputies. The expedition left Bangassou for Rafaï on 28 December 1893, with the goal of reaching Hofrah-el-Nahas on the Bahr-el-Fertit.

The column left Rafaï on 9 February 1894 heading north and northeast. On 15 February 1894 it reached Sango at the confluence of the Badabo and Mbili rivers. Nilis met chiefs of the Gabbous people there. Gonze fell ill and had to leave the expedition. He died on the way back to Rafaï. The column crossed the Shinko River and on 1 March 1894 reached Bandassi. It passed from the Shinko basin to the Kotto River basin, then the Adda River basin, a sub-tributary of the Nile. It stopped at Katuaka (8°48′N 24°26′E), home of chief Acmed Curcia. The post later known as Fort de l'Adda was founded there, with Gérard as commander assisted by Henrion. The column was stopped by floods and did not go further. It returned via Kuria, which it reached on 1 April 1894, and on 24 April 1894 arrived at Dabago, where commander Léon Hanolet was waiting. In May Nilis and de la Kethulle returned to Rafaï.

In October 1894 the Mahdist threat was growing, with increasing numbers of attacks. Francqui gave up his attempt to reach the Bahr-el-Ghazal. He gave Lieutenant Colmant the mission of reaching Dem-Ziber. Nilis, who was still in Rafaï with 150–200 men, was to leave for the Adda, then advance if possible to Mechra-el-Rek. Nilis was assisted by lieutenants Lannoy and Libois. An emergency march was made to Katuaka to reinforce Gérard, whose position was in great danger. Libois took command of Bandassi and Lannoy remained with Gerard. A Mahdist offensive threatened to overwhelm the Belgian posts, and the Adda post was already short of food. In the circumstances, Nilis ordered the defenders to leave Adda and brought them back to Rafaï. When he arrived at the Shinko he was ordered by the senior resident De Langhe to go to the rescue of Donckier in Bomu.

However, news arrived of the signing of the Franco-Belgian treaty on 14 August 1894 that defined the Bomu River as the frontier between the French and Belgian colonies. The Belgian posts north of the Bomu were to be withdrawn at once. Nilis, who had returned to Semio, was given command of Yakoma. On 1 January 1895 he was given interim command of the Ubangi-Bomu, and then the Ubangi area. He arrived in Banzyville on 10 March 1895, then moved on to Imese. He went down to Boma and on 21 May 1895 sailed from there for Europe.

== Last years (1895–1905) ==
Nilis then returned to his regiment after a short leave. Nilis obtained his pension in June 1901. He died in Ixelles, Belgium on 23 April 1905.

== Sources ==
- Coosemans, Marthe; Jadot, J. M. (15 June 1954), "AVAERT (Henri-Michel-Eugène)" (PDF), Biographie Coloniale Belge (in French), vol. V, Inst. roy. colon. belge, pp. col.20–24
- Coquilhat, Camille (1888), Sur le Haut-Congo (PDF) (in French), J. Lebègue
- Engels, A. (31 July 1947), "AMELOT (Louis-Gustave)", Biographie Coloniale Belge (in French), vol. I, Inst. roy. colon. belge, pp. 22–24
- Engels, A.; Coosemans, M. (1947), "NILIS (Théodore-Victor-Edouard-Adolphe-Arthur)", Biographie Coloniale Belge (in French), vol. I, Inst. roy. colon. belge, pp. col.732–738
- Martrin-Donos, Charles, baron de (1886), Les Belges dans l'Afrique centrale; voyages, aventures et découvertes d'après les documents et journaux des explorateurs (in French), Bruxelles: P. Maes
