= H. E. Crudgington =

Irish Baptist missionary

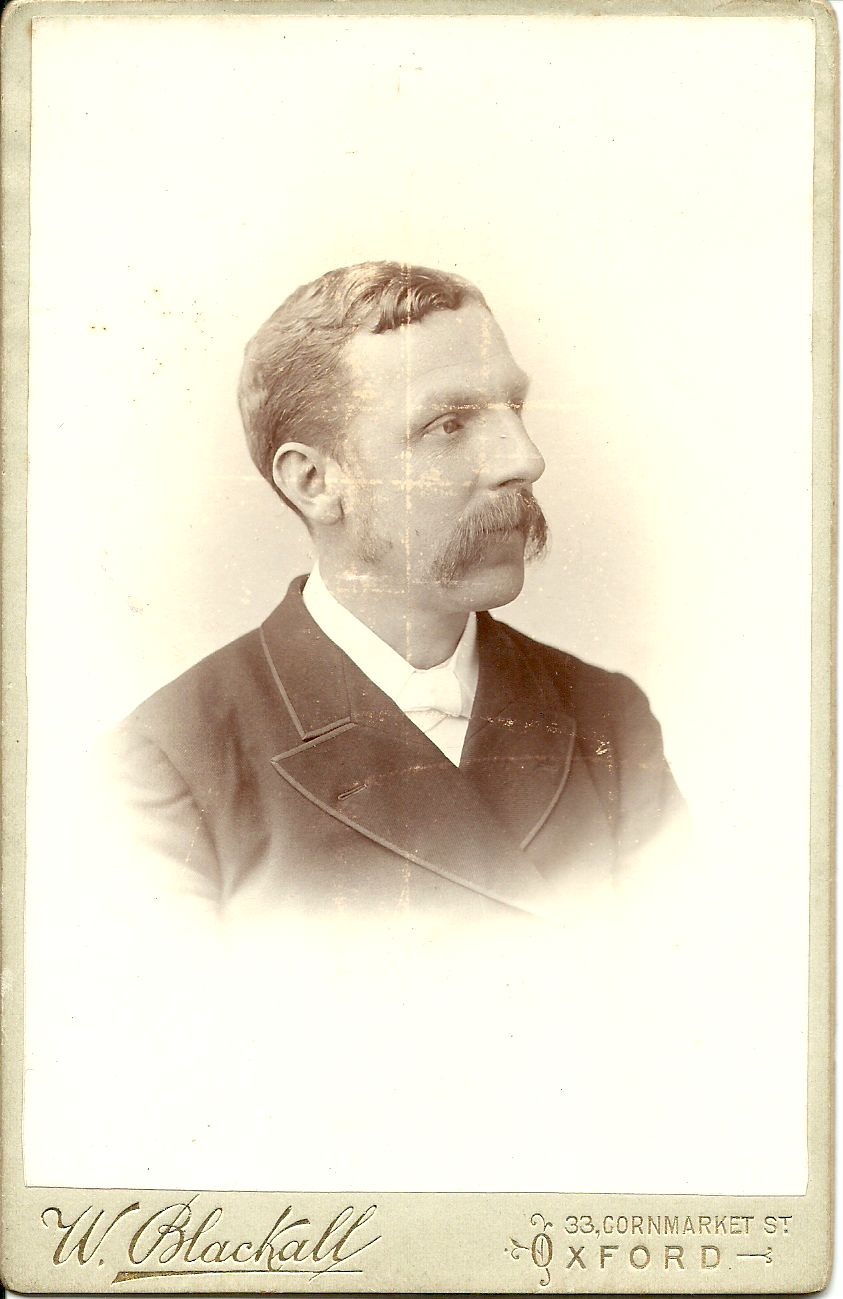
- Photograph circa 1900
- Born: 1852; Dublin, Ireland
- Died: 1931 (aged 78–79); Bath, Somerset, England
- Occupation: Missionary

H. E. Crudgington (1852–1931); Henry Edmund Crudgington, was a Baptist missionary from Ireland who was active in the Congo region before the Congo Free State was established.

== Early years ==
H. E. Crudgington was born Henry Edmund Crudgington in Dublin, Ireland in 1852; the son of John Crudgington (b.1818). He studied theology at Rawdon College, Leeds, England, and studied medicine at the hospital in Leeds. He was the first to be accepted by the Baptist Missionary Society of England as one of the pioneers who were going to help Thomas J. Comber found the Congolese Mission.

== Congo mission ==
=== Early days (1879–1881) ===
The small group of missionaries arrived in Banana on 9 June 1879, and went on to São Salvador. At first they lived in straw huts, but by the next spring they had completed a stone house. Comber and Crudgington left on 2 January 1880 hoping to reach Stanley Pool. They received a friendly reception almost everywhere, particularly in Mwala, where they stayed for a week. Crudgington stayed on for five weeks, practised medicine and founded a children's school. None of their attempts for 18 months managed to reach the Pool. During one of these trips Comber was shot in the back. In San Salvador, Crudgington operated to remove the bullet, which had lodged in Comber’s spine.

=== Journey to Stanley Pool (1881) ===
The missionaries decided to advance simultaneously along both banks of the river. Crudgington and William Holman Bentley left San Salvador on 8 January 1881 and followed the north shore, walking for 8 to 19 hours each day for 21 days through the Basundi and Babwende region to Stanley Pool. In Kintamo (Kinshasa) they had a reasonably friendly reception from Chief Ngaliema. Further up the local people were hostile, taking them for the advance guard of Henry Morton Stanley's expedition. When the French explorer Pierre Savorgnan de Brazza had passed through in the other direction, he had advised the people to resist Stanley's Belgians. The missionaries returned by a shorter route that took only 15 days. On 26 February 1881 Henry Morton Stanley, Victor Harou and Paul Nève boarded the Royal and steamed upstream from Isangila. At Nsouki they freed Crudgington and Bentley, whom the local people had taken prisoner. In total they had covered 800 kilometres (500 mi) and had been the first Europeans to reach the west shore of the Pool.

=== Later career ===
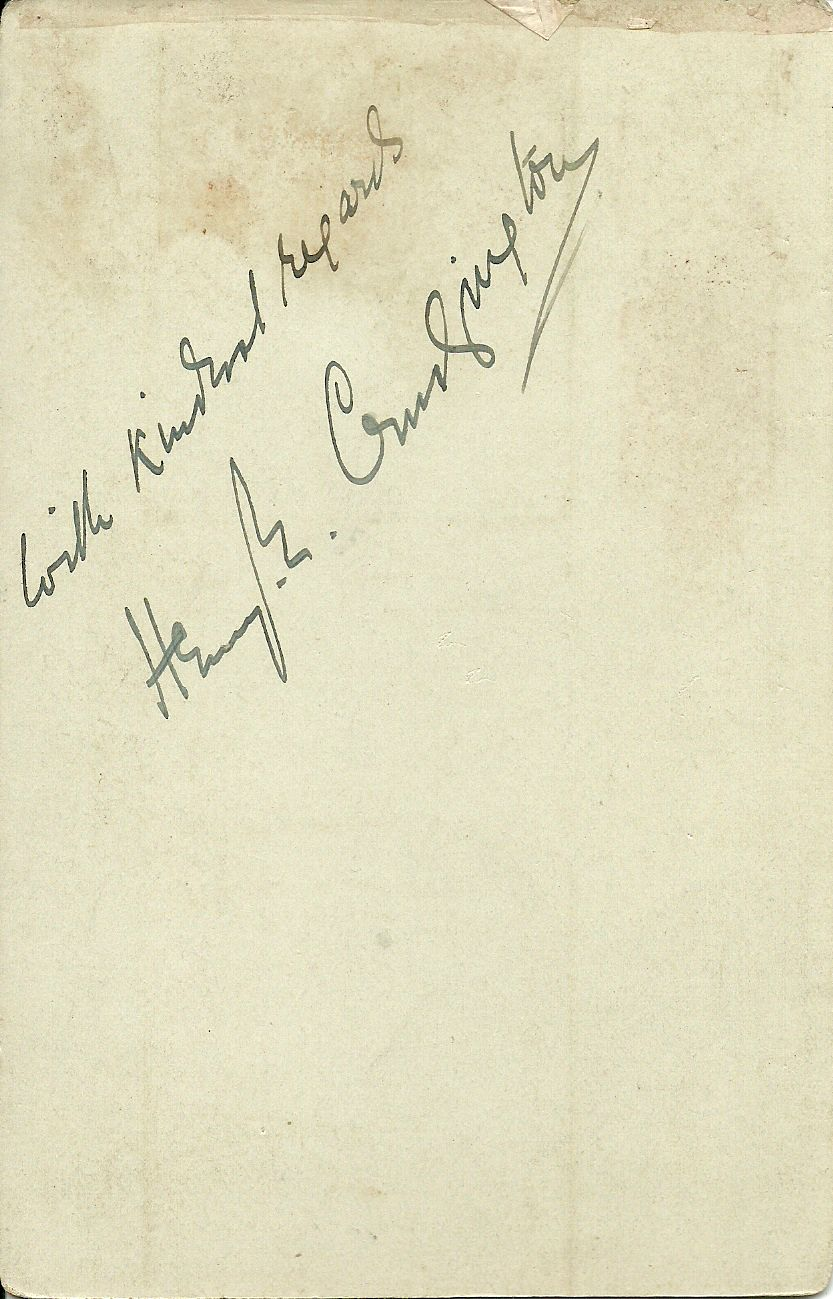
Signature on back of the above photograph of Henry E. Crudgington.

After his return, Crudgington suffered from feverish hemoglobinuria for two weeks. The missionaries decided that he should return to England to tell the society's committee about the mission's situation and expedite shipment of provisions and back-up personnel. Crudgington also hoped to be able to acquire a steel whaling boat for use in the navigable part of the Congo River between Isangila and Manyanga. Crudgington toured England raising support for the mission, and a friend from Plymouth gave him a whaling boat named the Plymouth. He left England to return to the Congo on 18 April 1882 with supplies and new staff, including Herbert Dixon.

Life was difficult for the missionaries in the early days. The journey from Vivi to Isangila took three days, over rugged country. Crudgington once had to walk 48 kilometres (30 mi) to have a tooth extracted. He married when he returned on leave to England for a second time. His wife - Harriett Wales Crudgington - came with him on his return to the Congo, but suffered badly from fevers. For this reason, the Missionary Society sent the couple to their mission in Delhi, India. Crudgington died in Bath, Somerset, England in 1931.His remains are buried in Locksbrook Cemetery in the Lower Weston region of Bath, along with his wife.

== Sources ==
- Coosemans, M. (14 February 1946c), "HAROU (Victor-Eugène-Jules)", Biographie Coloniale Belge (in French), vol. I, Inst. roy. colon. belge, pp. col. 493–496
- Stonelake, Alfred R.; Coxill, H. Wakelin (10 November 1948), "CRUDGINGTON (H. E.)" (PDF), Biographie Coloniale Belge (in French), vol. II, Inst. roy. colon. belge, pp. col. 210–212
