= Nicolas Grang =

Luxembourgish soldier

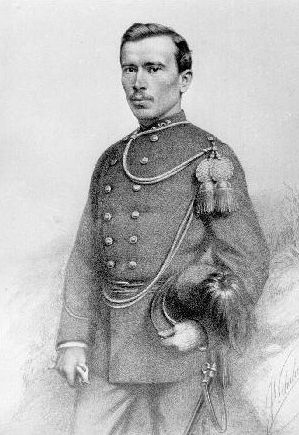
- Born: 2 January 1854; Buschrodt, Wahl, Luxembourg
- Died: 11 April 1883 (aged 29); Léopoldville, Congo
- Occupations: Soldier, explorer

Nicolas Grang (2 January 1854 – 11 April 1883) was a Luxembourgish soldier who died during an expedition to the Congo.

== Early years ==
Nicolas Grang was born on 2 January 1854 in Buschrodt, Wahl, Luxembourg, the eldest son of Jean Grang and Barbara Thibessart. His brother Michel Grang was born in 1855, and his sister Barbe Grang was born in 1858. He studied at the Athenaeum in Luxembourg.

Grang enlisted as a soldier in the Belgian 9th line regiment on 22 June 1876, entered the Military School on 7 May 1877, and was named sub-lieutenant. in the carabiniers regiment on 14 May 1879. On 30 October 1881 he was seconded to the Military Cartographic Institute, and on 18 January 1882 joined the Comité d'études du Haut-Congo.

== Congo expedition ==
Grang was assigned to a group led by Henry Morton Stanley tasked with exploring the upper Congo River. They embarked on the steamer Heron in Antwerp in January 1882. The group included Grang, Edmond Hanssens, Joseph Vandevelde and Théodore Nilis. They landed at Banana on 8 March 1882.

On 20 March 1882 Grang and Nilis stayed with Calewaert in Vivi, on their way to Léopoldville. Grang and the engineering lieutenant Louis Valcke reached Manyanga on 21 April 1882. Valcke and Charles-Marie de Braconnier had been appointed to command the Léopoldville station with Grang as second in command. In August 1882 Grang came to the aid of the scientific expedition of Eduard Pechuël-Loesche, which was attacked in Mowa. Callewaert led troops from Manyanga and Grang led others from Léopoldville to reinforce Nilis and restore order.

On 7 September 1882 Hanssens and Grang suppressed a rebellion on the south bank of the Congo. They decided to found a station at Lutete with lieutenant Alphonse van Gèle as the first commander. A little later, at a time of serious difficulty with Ngaliema, chief of Ntamo, Grang offered to remain as a hostage while Ngaliema went to parlay with the Belgians in Léopoldville. Grang felt humiliated by his treatment during this period, although the discussions were fruitful. Braconnier, who was sick, handed over command of Léopoldville to Grang. On 17 December 1882 Grang tried out the steamer En Avant, with captain G.-H. Vandevelde, but without success. The steam inlet valve had somehow been removed and the tubes carrying steam to the cylinders leaked badly.

On 30 December 1882 Grang learned that Stanley had arrived at Vivi, and Hanssens, Valcke and Grang were to meet him there to receive their instructions. Vaclke was to transport two boilers of the A.I.A. steamer from where they had been abandoned near Lutete to the Pool, taking the left bank route. Stanley would himself bring the lighter and the steamer Royal, which had been serving the stretch between Isangila and Manyanga, using 300 newly-arrived African workers. Grang and Anderson of the Royal assisted him, as well as two mechanics. The two boats started on 7 February 1883 and reached the Inkisi River on 27 February 1883, which they crossed to continue on the left bank. Stanley left Grang and Anderson in charge of continuing from there while he went on to the Pool to speed up assembly of the A.I.A. and prepare for the supply of the 11 Belgians and 420 Africans that would soon arrive there.

The Royal finally reached the Pool. Grang, suffering from recurring fevers, continued to actively help prepare for the expedition to the Stanley Falls. Grang caught cold during a tornado one afternoon, failed to recover and died on 11 April 1883. He was buried in the Cimetiere des Pionniers in Léopoldville, the first European to be interred there. Stanley later described Grang as highly loyal, intelligent and brave. On 29 January 1953 Minister of State Pierre Dupong laid flowers on Grang's grave. His name was inscribed on a plate on the Stanley Monument in 1956. A street was named after him in Buschrodt.

== Sources ==
- Engels, A. (23 December 1946), "HANSSENS (Edmond-Winnie-Victor)", Biographie Coloniale Belge, vol. I, Inst. roy. colon. belge, pp. col. 479–493
- Engels, A.; Coosemans, M. (1947), "NILIS (Théodore-Victor-Edouard-Adolphe-Arthur)", Biographie Coloniale Belge (in French), vol. I, Inst. roy. colon. belge, pp. col.732–738
- Guébels, L. (22 May 1947), "GRANG (Nicolas)", Biographie Coloniale Belge (in French), vol. I, Inst. roy. colon. belge, pp. col. 437–440
- Hoffmann, Serge (May 2001), "Les Luxembourgeois au Congo belge" (PDF), Forum 208 (in French)
- Nicolas Grang: ein junger Mann erforscht unbekanntes Land in Afrika (in German), Administration Communale de Wahl
