= Mechra el Rek =

Coordinates: 8.5887°N 29.3338°E

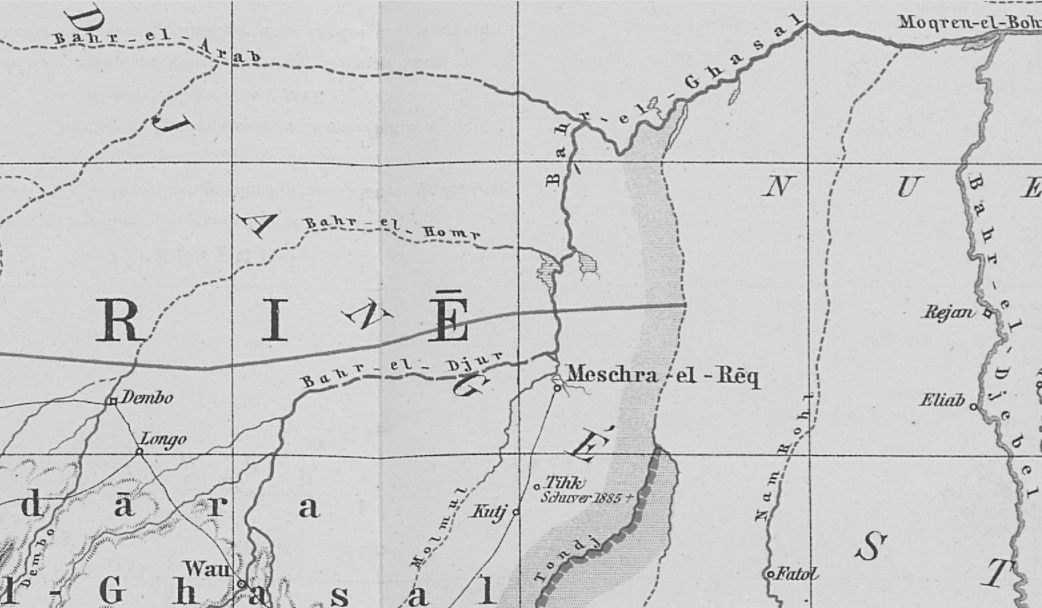
1888 map by Frank Lupton showing the location of Mechra el Rek

Mechra el Rek was a settlement in the South Sudan.

== Location ==
Above its entry into Lake No the Bahr el Ghazal River leads through the land of the Nuer people through immense marshes covered in reeds. It then reaches a sort of dead end at the foot of which is Mechra el Rek, the only mechra (Note: Mechra means "unloading", a place for storage of goods.) of the region. As its name suggests, it was located in the country of the Rek people, a subgroup of the Dinka people.

== History ==
The Rek were the first to ally themselves with the Khartoum ivory merchants and to supply porters, although the Dinka in general were hostile to the Sudanese. Early in October 1856 the merchant Ali Amouri passed through Mechra el Rek accompanied by Zobeir. They crossed the land of the Dinkas and a few days later reached the land of the Diour people, where Ali Amouri had a station called Ashur, the name of the sheikh of the district. Zobeir returned to Khartoum in October 1858 with a capital of 1,000 Egyptian pounds, his share of the company's profits. He bought a boat, a large quantity of goods and assembled a large troop armed with rifles. He reached Mechra el Rek without incident, despite the obstacles the Sudd presents to navigation. He hired some local porters and left by land for Bahr el Ghazal, planning to explore land that traders had not yet reached.

In 1869 Giaffar Mazhar Pasha, governor of the Sudan, sent an expedition south to take possession of Bahr el Ghazal, which had been controlled by the ivory merchants of Khartoum for many years.

In October 1894 the Mahdist threat in the Sudan was growing, with increasing numbers of attacks against the Belgians. The Belgian Théodore Nilis, who was still in Rafaï with 150–200 men, was to leave for the Adda River, then advance if possible to Mechra-el-Rek. A Mahdist offensive threatened to overwhelm the Belgian posts, and the Adda post was already short of food. In the circumstances, Nilis ordered the defenders to leave Adda and brought them back to Rafaï.

== Sources ==
- Douin, G. (1938), Histoire de Regne du Khédive Ismail (PDF) (in French), Société Royale de Géographie d'Égypte
- Engels, A.; Coosemans, M. (1947), "NILIS (Théodore-Victor-Edouard-Adolphe-Arthur)", Biographie Coloniale Belge (in French), vol. I, Inst. roy. colon. belge, pp. col.732–738
