= Henri Avaert =

Belgian soldier and colonial administrator

Henri Michel Eugène Avaert
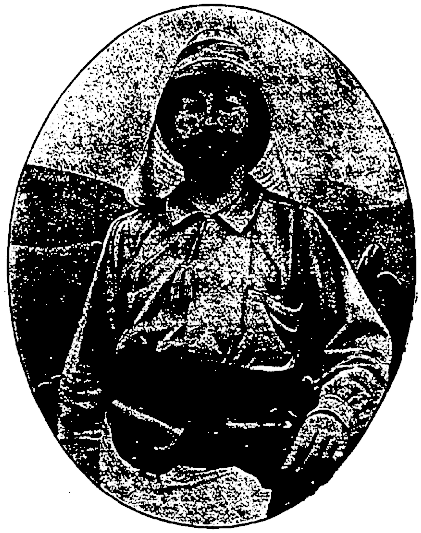
- Avaert from Coquilhat's Sur le Haut-Congo (1888)
- Born: 4 October 1851; Saint-Josse-ten-Noode, Belgium
- Died: 2 January 1923 (aged 71); Bonn, Germany
- Occupations: Soldier, colonial administrator

Henri Michel Eugène Avaert (4 October 1851 – 2 January 1923) was a Belgian soldier and colonial administrator in the Congo Free State. He was the second commander of the Force Publique, the armed police.

== Early years (1851–1882) ==
Henri Michel Eugène Avaert was born on 4 October 1851 in Saint-Josse-ten-Noode, Belgium. His parents were Richard-Joseph Avaert and Léocadie Monier. He attended school for army children, and joined the Belgian army on 6 September 1867. On 15 December 1873 he was appointed 2nd lieutenant in the infantry. He was seconded to the War Department on 25 December 1878. On 24 December 1879 he was promoted to lieutenant and assigned to the 5th line regiment. On 7 February 1882 he was authorized to enter the service of the International Association of the Congo.

== First term on the Congo (1882–1883) ==
Avaert left Antwerp on 15 August 1882 with Camille Coquilhat, Émile Parfonry and the accountant Brunfaut, and reached Banana on 22 September 1882. The group reached Vivi on 27 September 1882, where Alexander von Danckelman assigned Parfonry to Isangila, Avaert to Manyanga and Coquilhat to Léopoldville and beyond. They traveled by land from Vivi and reached Isangila on 4 October 1882. On 11 October Avaert, Lieven Van de Velde, Martin, Louis-Gustave Amelot and Coquilhat took the steamer Royal up to Manyanga. Amelot fell sick and had to return. Avaert remained at Manyanga under the command of Théodore Nilis. He fell ill, but was treated with a combination of morphine and quinine by the Reverend William Holman Bentley of the Baptist Missionary Society, and was able to return to Isangila on the Royal. He later told Coquilhat that his life had been saved by these injections.

Avaert was in Isangila when the overall commander Henry Morton Stanley returned, and appointed Avaert to stay in Isangila, which was to be the base for the Niari-Kwilu expedition led by Edmond Hanssens. Avaert engaged local workers from the nearby villages to build a house for Europeans on the plateau in front of a long avenue planted with banana trees. Avaert's health remained poor, and on 16 August 1883 he was replaced by Willem Frans Van Kerckhoven. He returned via Vivi and Banana, reaching Belgium on 8 December 1883. He went back to his regiment, but was appointed inspector of studies at the Military School, and was seconded to the Cartographic Institute.

== Later terms in the Congo (1886–1889) ==
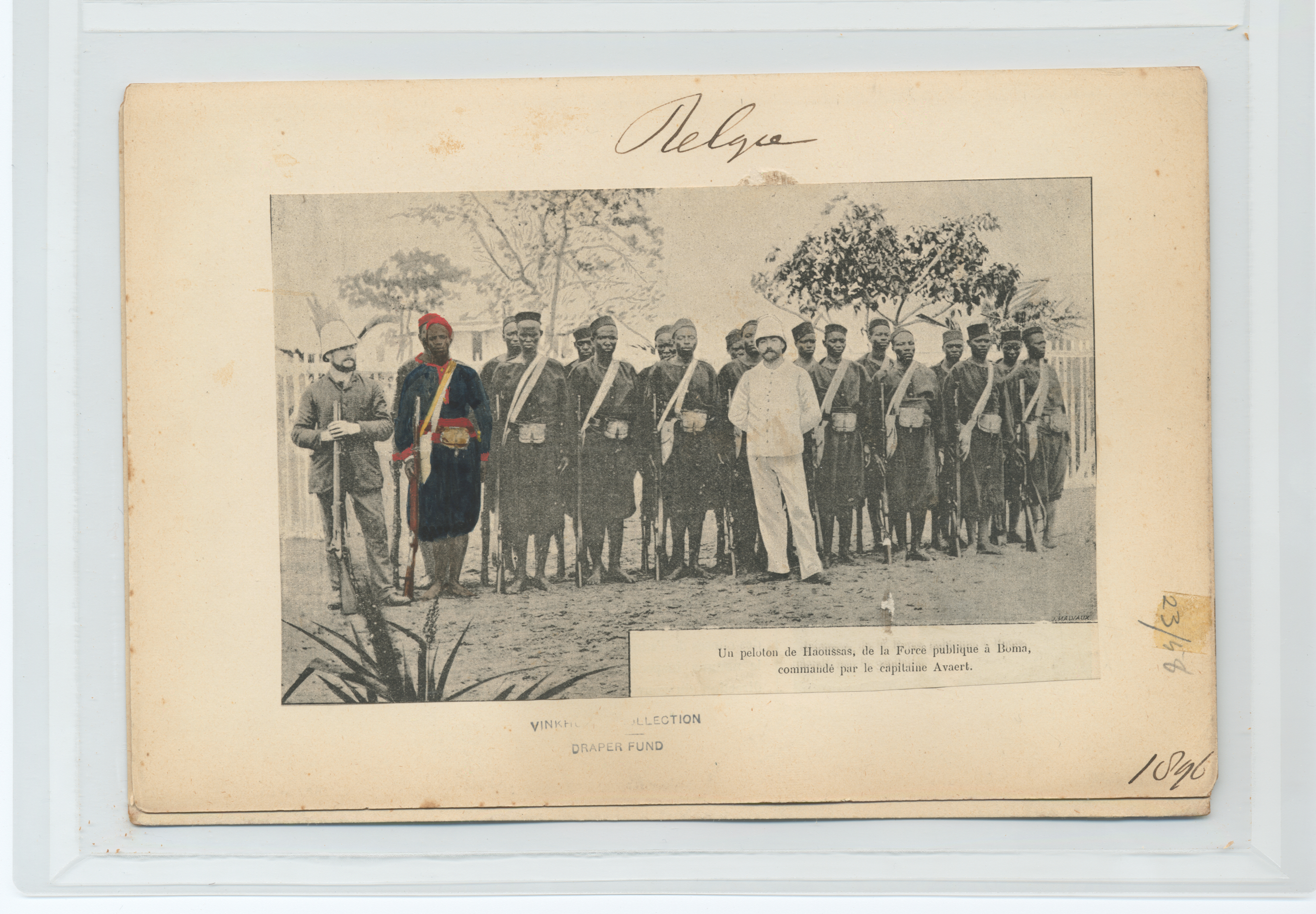
A platoon of Hausas, Force Publique in Boma, commanded by Captain Avaert

Avaert applied to return to Africa. He left from Rotterdam on 15 February 1886 and reached Banana on 13 March 1886. He started off for Vivi, but was diverted to Boma, where the central administration of the new Congo Free State was being established. Avaert was made deputy to Léon Roget to help organize the first contingent of the Force Publique from 75 Bangalas sent down to the lower Congo by Van Kerckhoven. He was also made an officer of the Court of Appeal, was given charge of the mission to Massabi in the Portuguese territory of Cabinda, and was assigned to direct the development of the caravan trail from Vivi to Manyanga. In December 1886, as assistant to Avaert, Camille Van den Plas took part in the expedition to Manyanga and was responsible for the evacuation of Vivi.

Avaert left the Congo to return to Belgium in May 1887. He was promoted to captain on 26 March 1888. He left for Africa on 24 August 1888 and arrived in Boma on 21 September 1888, where he assumed command of the Force Publique from Roget. He was assisted by lieutenants Fiévez, Debergh and Léon Hanolet, 13 Belgian non-commissioned officers and soldiers, and 28 Hausa or Bangala instructors. He engaged in a successful action against the Mussorongo tribe, which had been looting factories in the Congo River delta. A battery of 7.5 cm cannon proved decisive. Avaert returned to Belgium in October 1889.

== Later career (1890–1923) ==
Avaert was attached to the Ministry of Interior and sent on a special mission to Egypt on 27 May 1890. On 25 June 1891 he was appointed captain-commander. On 21 August 1891 he was sent to Mozambique on another special mission, returning to Europe on 3 December 1891. He was appointed major on 25 December 1898, lieutenant-colonel of the 3rd line regiment on 26 June 1903 and colonel in command of the 3rd line regiment on 26 June 1906. On 26 March 1910 Avaert was given command of the 9th infantry brigade, and retained this command when he was appointed major general on 26 June 1910. He was pensioned on 8 December 1913. Avaert died in Bonn, Germany on 2 January 1923.

== Sources ==
- Coosemans, Marthe; Jadot, J. M. (15 June 1954), "AVAERT (Henri-Michel-Eugène)" (PDF), Biographie Coloniale Belge (in French), vol. V, Inst. roy. colon. belge, pp. col.20–24
- Coquilhat, Camille (1888), Sur le Haut-Congo (PDF) (in French), J. Lebègue
- Engels, A. (31 July 1947), "AMELOT (Louis-Gustave)", Biographie Coloniale Belge (in French), vol. I, Inst. roy. colon. belge, pp. 22–24
- Pardoen, A. (15 July 1947), "PLAS (VAN DEN) (Camille - ThéodoreJoseph)", Biographie Coloniale Belge (in French), vol. I, Inst. roy. colon. belge, pp. col. 758–760
