= List of protected heritage sites in Manage =

This table shows an overview of the protected heritage sites in the Walloon town Manage. This list is part of Belgium's national heritage.

Object	Year/architect	Town/section	Address	Coordinates	Number^{?}	Image
Castle of Cour-au-Bois and environment ^{(nl)} ^{(fr)}		Manage	chaussée de Nivelles n°42	50.508926°N 4.231402°E	52043-CLT-0001-01 Info	
Rectory of the parish of Saint-Jean Baptiste and the surrounding wall ^{(nl)} ^{(fr)}		Manage	place de l'église n°17	50.503313°N 4.216861°E	52043-CLT-0003-01 Info	
The lane, the park and gardens of Mariemont ^{(nl)} ^{(fr)}		Manage	chaussée de Mariemont 100	50.476791°N 4.245050°E	52043-CLT-0006-01 Info	De dreef, het park en de tuinen van Mariemont
The park entrance and double allee of the domain of Mariemont ^{(nl)} ^{(fr)}		Manage		50.476791°N 4.245050°E	52043-PEX-0001-01 Info	Het park en dubbele toegangsallee van het domein van Mariemont

== See also ==
- List of protected heritage sites in Hainaut (province)
- Manage, Belgium
