= Thomas Comber =

Thomas Comber may refer to:

- Thomas Comber (dean of Carlisle) (1575–1654)
- Thomas Comber (dean of Durham) (1645–1699)
- Thomas J. Comber, Baptist missionary from England
