= Victor Harou =

Belgian soldier and explorer

Victor Eugène Jules Harou
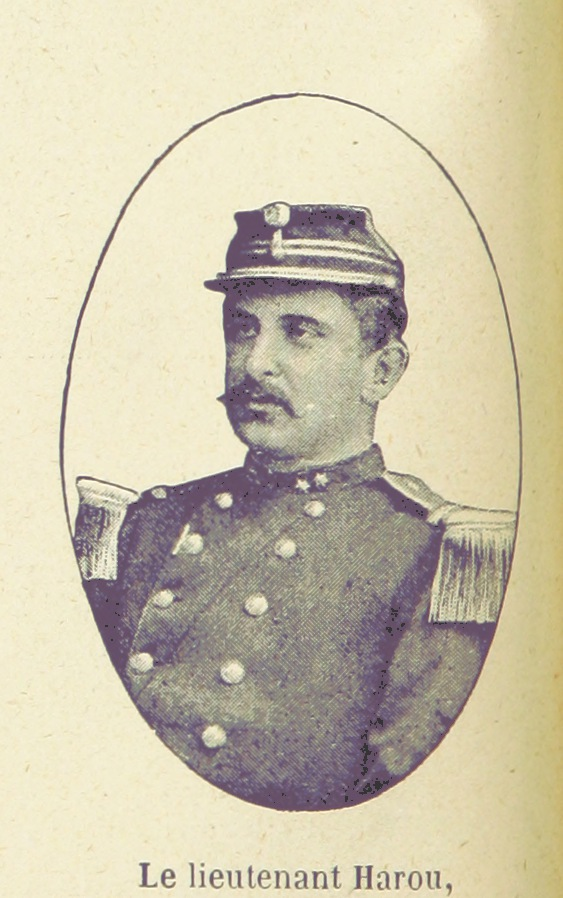
- Harou from Le Congo en images, raconté aux enfants. Histoire, habitants, mœurs, civilisation, portraits des explorateurs, etc (1896)
- Born: 25 September 1851
- Died: 12 August 1923 (aged 71)
- Occupations: Soldier, explorer

Victor Eugène Jules Harou (25 September 1851 – 12 August 1923) was a Belgian soldier and explorer.

== Early years ==
Victor Eugène Jules Harou was born on 25 September 1851 in Fayt-lez-Seneffe (today Fayt-lez-Manage), Hainaut Province, Belgium. His parents were Adrien-Victor-Joseph Harou and Victorine-Joséphine-Marguerite Velloni. His younger brother was Prosper Harou. (Note: Prosper Harou traveled out to the Congo with Joseph Conrad in 1890, and is mentioned in his classic Heart of Darkness.) He joined the army and entered military school on 1 December 1868. He entered the War School of 22 September 1874. He was promoted to lieutenant of the 5th line regiment.

== Colonial career ==
Harou engaged with the Comité d'Etudes du Haut-Congo. On 15 August 1880 he boarded the Gaboon in Liverpool in the company of Paul Nève, Charles-Marie de Braconnier, Louis Valcke and Vanden Boogaerde. They transferred to the Biafra at the mouth of the Niger, and reached Banana on 3 October 1880. On 6–8 October they traveled up the Congo River in the steamer Belgique to Vivi, where Augustus Sparhawk was the station commander. On 9 December 1880 Harou commanded a caravan of mules and donkey loaded with equipment to join the overall commander Henry Morton Stanley. He was seconded by Nève. They made their way eastward with difficulty along a poorly marked and uneven trail, and at one point had to take the cargo across the Boundi River by raft. Eventually they found Stanley near the place where he would establish the Isangila station on 24 February 1880.

On 26 February 1881 Stanley, Harou and Nève boarded the Royal and steamed upstream from Isangila. At Nsouki they freed two Protestant missionaries, H. E. Crudgington and William Holman Bentley, whom the local people had taken prisoner. In March Braconnier joined the expedition. On 8 April 1881 they reached the mouth of the Eluala, in Basundi territory. They stopped at Ntombe-Mataka, where Braconnier and Nève stayed while Stanley and Harou continued northeast looking for a suitable place to found the new Manyanga post. They found a platform that dominated the river, where they laid the foundation of the post in May 1881. Local people arrived and objected, but settled for a monthly tribute of two pieces of cloth. Harou was made station commander, Braconnier and Nève reached the station early in May. Everyone fell ill with fever, including Stanley.

On 20 April 1882 Harou was ordered by Stanley to return to Europe. His engagement was until August, but the hardships of his station at Manyanga-Nord were too much for his health. He handed over his command to Théodore Nilis. In 1883 he returned to lead a new journey of exploration. He served under Stanley for the Comité d'Études and the International Association of the Congo until 1884. Harou died on 12 August 1923 in Ixelles, Belgium.

== Publications ==
- Souvenirs de voyage dans l’Afrique centrale, Revue artistique, Anvers, 1880-1881
- Lettres, Bulletin de la Société belge de Géographie, 1881, p. 464, 560

== Sources ==
- Coosemans, M. (14 February 1946c), "HAROU (Victor-Eugène-Jules)", Biographie Coloniale Belge (in French), vol. I, Inst. roy. colon. belge, pp. col. 493–496
- Lacroix, A. (1952), "HAROU (Prosper-Félix-Joseph)" (PDF), Biographie Coloniale Belge (in French), vol. III, Inst. roy. colon. belge, pp. col. 418–419
- Martrin-Donos, Charles, baron de (1886), Les Belges dans l'Afrique centrale; voyages, aventures et découvertes d'après les documents et journaux des explorateurs (in French), Bruxelles: P. Maes
- Sherry, Norman (1980-06-12), Conrad's Western World, Cambridge University Press, ISBN 978-0-521-29808-7
