= Émile Parfonry =

Belgian soldier

Emile-Désiré Parfonry
- Born: 20 July 1857; Hotton, Luxembourg Province, Belgium
- Died: 24 March 1883 (aged 25); Manyanga, Congo
- Occupations: Soldier, colonialist

Emile-Désiré Parfonry (20 July 1857 – 24 March 1883) was a Belgian soldier who served in the Congo before the Congo Free State was established.

== Early years ==
Emile-Désiré Parfonry was born in Hotton, Luxembourg Province, Belgium on 20 July 1857. His parents were Jean-Joseph Parfonry and Marie-Joséphine Robertfroid. He joined the army and became a sub-lieutenant in the 10th Line Regiment. In 1882 he joined the Comité d'Etudes du Haut-Congo.

== Congo expedition ==
On 15 August 1882 Parfonry left for Africa in the company of Camille Coquilhat, Henri Avaert, the accountant Émile Brunfaut and Guillaume Vandevelde. They arrived in Banana on 22 September 1882, and on 26–27 September 1883 travelled up the lower Congo River to Vivi. Brunfaur remained at Vivi, and on 30 September 1883 Coquilhat, Avaert, Parfonry and Vandevelde, along with Édouard Destrain, Louis-Gustave Amelot and the sailor Martin set off for Isangila. On the way they met Eduard Pechuël-Loesche, who had come down from the Upper Congo on the Royal.

Parfonry remained in Isangila to replace Anthony Bannister Swinburne, the head of the station, who was returning to Europe at the end of his term of service. In March 1883 there were rumors of a revolt in Isangila, and Amelot accompanied Théodore Nilis and Joseph Vandevelde to come to the aid of Parfonry. With the arrival of reinforcements the problem was resolved, and Amelot continued on to Manyanga. That month the overall commander, Henry Morton Stanley replaced Parfonry by Avaert as head of Isangila and assigned Parfonry to work on the caravan route along the south of the Congo. This difficult task had been abandoned in October 1882. Parforny notified Nilis at Manyanga of his new task on 4 March 1883. He had only 40 Zanzibari workers, who were not trained in road construction, but were capable of the hard work of clearing and levelling the route.

On 10 March 1883 Parfonry heard that Alphonse van Gèle had been ordered to join Stanley beyond the Stanley Pool, replaced as head of Lutete by Napoleon Lukšić. Lukšić was immobilized by Jiggers and Amelot was made interim station head at Lutete. On 14 March 1883 Parfonry came down with sunstroke, and was carried to Manyanga for treatment by Doctor Vanden Heuvel. On 18 March 1883 Lukšić, who was watching Parfonry as he slept, committed suicide with a revolver. The sound woke Parfonry, who became delirious when he saw the corpse. His illness developed into typhoid fever, and he died on 24 March 1883.

There is a Rue Emile Parfonry in his birthplace, Hotton.

== Sources ==
- Coosemans, M. (17 December 1945), "PARFONRY (Emile-Désiré)", Biographie Coloniale Belge (in French), vol. I, Inst. roy. colon. belge, pp. col. 741-744
- Engels, A. (31 July 1947), "AMELOT (Louis-Gustave)", Biographie Coloniale Belge (in French), vol. I, Inst. roy. colon. belge, pp. 22–24
- "Way: Rue Emile Parfonry", OpenStreetMap
