= Henry Hawkes =

Henry Hawkes B.A., FLS. (1805–1886) was an English unitarian clergyman and author, born at Dukinfield, now part of Greater Manchester. He is best known for his memoir of the ragged schools originator John Pounds (1766—1839), to whom he was introduced in 1833, soon after arriving in Portsmouth to serve as a minister. His published works include sermons and The Passover Moon (1878) a study of the divinity of Christ. He was christened on 28 April 1805 at the Old Chapel-Presbyterian, in Dukinfield. He befriended John Pounds while serving as the Minister of the Unitarian Chapel in High Street. In 1881 he was retired and lodging in Elm Grove Marston Lodge in Portsea, Portsmouth. He was unmarried.
