= Barton in the Beans =

Hamlet in Leicestershire, England

Coordinates: 52.65°N 1.42°W

Barton-in-the-Beans
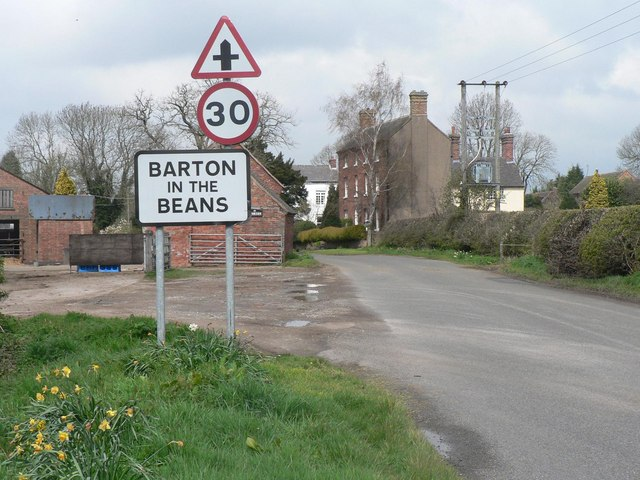
- Entrance to the village

- Location within Leicestershire
- Civil parish: Shackerstone
- District: Hinckley and Bosworth
- Shire county: Leicestershire
- Region: East Midlands
- Country: England
- Sovereign state: United Kingdom
- Post town: NUNEATON
- Postcode district: CV13
- Dialling code: 01455
- Police: Leicestershire
- Fire: Leicestershire
- Ambulance: East Midlands
- UK Parliament: Hinckley and Bosworth

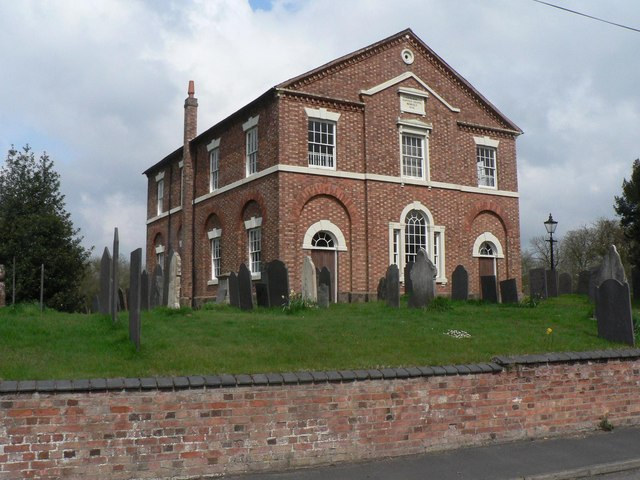
Baptist chapel

Barton in the Beans is a hamlet and former civil parish, now in the parish of Shackerstone, in the Hinckley and Bosworth district of Leicestershire, England. There are no shops or pubs in the hamlet, but it contains a Baptist Church and a post box. It was in the 18th century an important centre for the Baptist Church and the minister at Barton was the notable clockmaker Samuel Deacon (1746–1816). In 1931 the parish had a population of 177.

One of the earliest mentions of this place is in the Domesday Book where it is listed among the lands given to Hugh de Grandmesnil by the King (the land required half a plough and there were 2 acres (0.81 ha) of meadow). During the Middle Ages the land passed through many hands including several members of the family of Hastings.

== Toponymy ==
Barton is one of many places in England with this name: both this Barton and that in Nottinghamshire were once known as "Barton-in-Fabis" but that is no longer used for the Leicester Barton. In the Domesday Book both are just 'Bartone' and later usage has varied (the meaning of Barton in both cases is probably 'grange' i.e. an outlying farm within an estate).

A popular saying in the county is "Shake a Leicestershire man by the collar and you may hear the beans rattle in his belly": the author John Benjamin Firth quotes this from a contributor to Magna Britannia, 1820. Leicestershire was once noted for cultivating the broad bean (Vicia faba) and in this way the bean has been perpetuated in place-names.

== Samuel Deacon and the Barton Baptists ==
In 1751 six men associated with a Baptist group at Barton registered themselves as dissenting preachers under the Act of Toleration. These included Samuel Deacon. By 1759 they had established another church in Melbourne, then at Kegworth, Loughborough and Kirkby Woodhouse. Next they extended to Hinckley and Longford in Warwickshire.

Deacon was from Ratby and settled at Barton ca. 1765 and set up in business as a clockmaker. Another of the Baptist preachers, Joseph Donisthorpe, was also a clockmaker. Deacon's workshop was preserved by his successors and after many years of continuous use is now in the collections of the Leicester Museum. He was a leader of the General Baptists sect and the author of many works, including his autobiography.

The Baptist church became highly influential across the region. Dan Taylor, founder of the Baptist New Connexion, found the church 'strenuous advocates' of the 'essential truths' of the Gospel.

== Governance ==
Barton in the Beans was formerly a township, from 1866 Barton in the Beans was a civil parish in its own right until it was abolished on 1 April 1935 and merged with Shackerstone.

== Notable residents ==
- John Goodman (born 1765) was a Baptist preacher who hired out leeches for bloodletting. The leeches came from lakes in Cheshire and North Wales through which Goodman would wade with bare legs.
- George Darnell (1798–1857) was a schoolmaster born in Barton in the Beans who became famous in the 19th century for Darnell's Copybooks.
