= Carey Bonner =

British hymnwriter

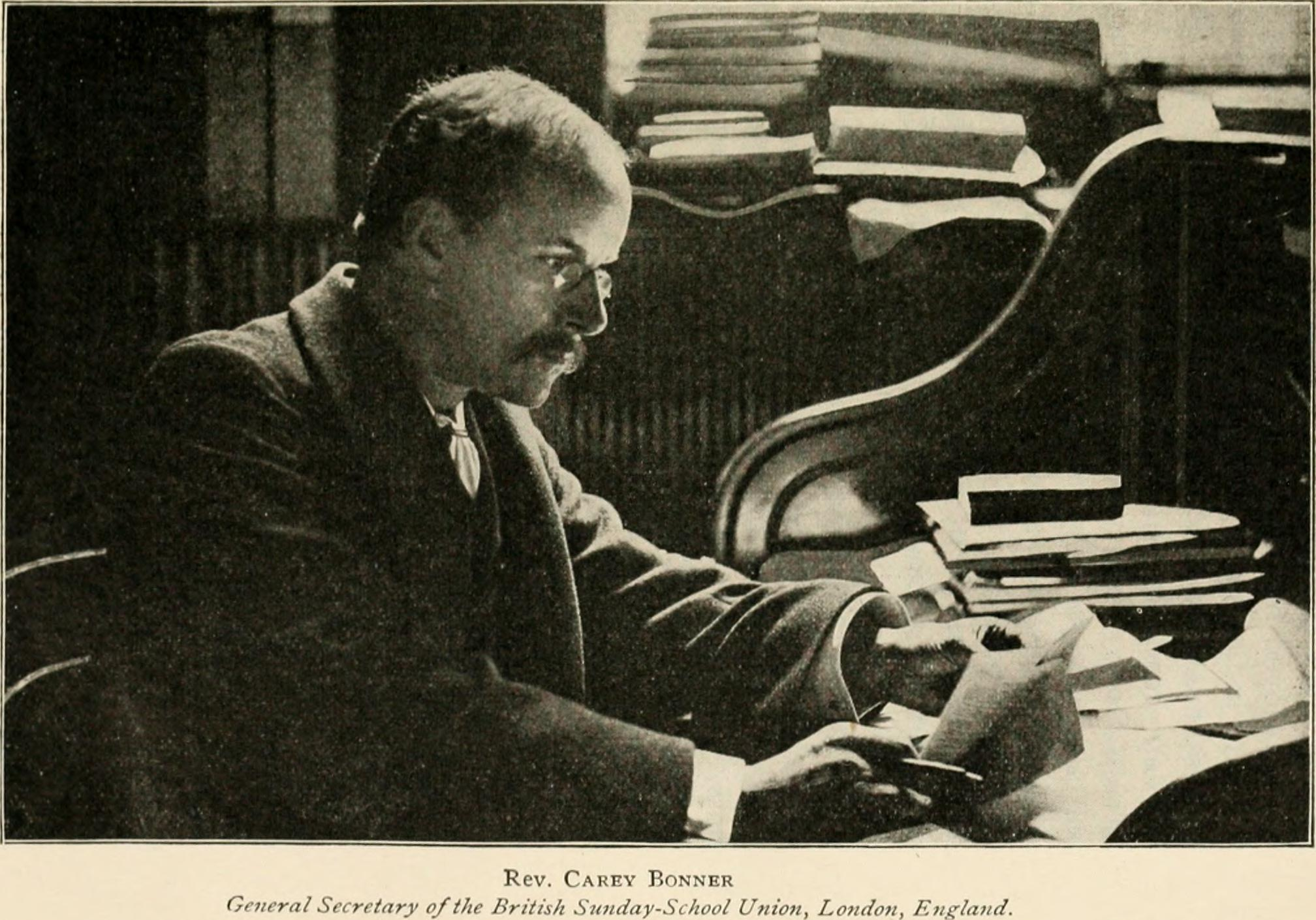
- Carey Bonner, General Secretary of the British Sunday-School Union in London, England
- Born: Carey; May 1, 1859; Southwark, Surrey
- Died: June 16, 1938 (aged 79)
- Occupation: composer

Carey Bonner, Rev (1 May 1859 – 16 June 1938) was a Baptist minister who served as the General Secretary of the National Sunday School Union from 1900 until 1929 and as Joint Secretary of the World Sunday School Association.

== Biography ==
Bonner was born in Southwark, Surrey on 1 May 1859. A composer and hymnist, he wrote and arranged hymns, choral works and sacred cantatas and compiled a number of hymnals. He is known for The Sunday School Hymnary (1905) and The Baptist Church Hymnal (1933). His Ministerial training was at Rawdon Baptist College in Leeds. He was ordained in 1884, and ministered in Sale, near Manchester (1884-1895), and at the Portland Chapel, Southampton (1895-1900). He was Secretary of the Lancashire & Cheshire Association of Baptist Churches 1893-94. He went on to become involved in the Sunday School movement, secretary in 1900, and president of the National Sunday School Union (1922-1923). He was President of the Baptist Union of Great Britain from 1931 to 1932.

Bonner died on 16 June 1938 in Muswell Hill.

== Selected works ==
- Some Baptist Hymnists from the Seventeenth Century to Modern Times, 1937
- The Sunday School Hymnary, 1905
- Bunyan the Dreamer (sacred cantata) 1928
- The Romance of the English Bible, 1927
- The Baptist Church Hymnal, 1933
- The Christian Endeavour Hymnal, 1904
- Three Choral Benedictions: 1. Of Grace and Peace. 2. Of Farewell. 3. Of the Trinity, c. 1890
- The Blind Maid of Bethany (sacred cantata) c.1910
- The New Crusaders (sacred cantata), 1914
- The Ship of Adventure:The story of the "Mayflower" (sacred cantata) 1920
- Day-dawn: the Story of a Noble Venture: the Sunday School and Robert Raikes (sacred cantata) 1930
- Greatheart: The Story of John Pounds (sacred cantata) 1934

Source: COPAC
