= Rawdon College =

Baptist college in Rawdon, West Yorkshire, England

Rawdon Baptist College
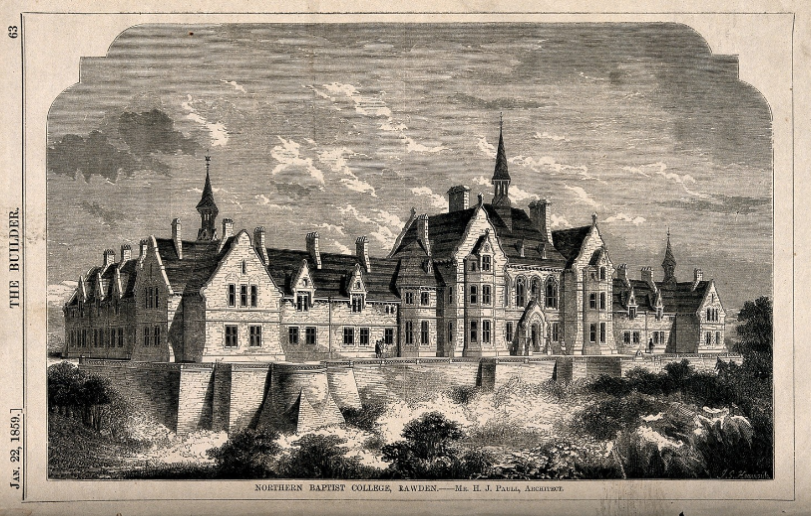
- Northern Baptist College, Rawden, 1859
- Other names: Rawdon College
- Type: Missionary training college
- Active: 1859–1961
- Parent institution: Northern Baptist Education Society
- Religious affiliation: Baptists
- Academic affiliations: University of Leeds
- Location: Rawdon, West Yorkshire, England; 53.8439°N 1.6835°W

Rawdon Baptist College, or simply Rawdon College, was a Baptist institution in West Yorkshire that trained missionaries.

== Location ==
Rawdon College is on Woodlands Drive in Rawdon, West Yorkshire. It is set in woodlands looking over the River Aire, and was built specifically for use as a residential college. Robert Milligan sold the land to the Baptists, and then gave back half the purchase price. The college was designed by the architect J. H. Paul of Cardiff. The buildings were in Tudor Gothic style, with the library, classroom and principal's residence in the central building, and student apartments on each side. The cost was more than £12,000.

== History ==
Rawdon College replaced the Horton Academy of Little Horton, Bradford, which the Yorkshire and Lancashire Baptists had founded in 1804, using an adapted weaving shed as its premises. Horton and Rawdon were both run by the Northern Baptist Education Society. Rawdon College was opened on 4 September 1859 in a ceremony attended by 700 people. The president of the meeting was Sir Francis Crossley, of Halifax. Sir Titus Salt, the industrialist who created Saltaire, was present.

The purpose of the college was to identify and train evangelistic preachers. At first students were prepared to take degrees at the University of London. James Acworth was head of Horton and then Rawdon College from 1836 to 1853. William Medley taught at Rawdon from 1869 to 1908, and was the most significant philosopher at the college. He was the author of Christ the Truth. An Essay towards the Organization of Christian Thinking (1900).

Rawdon was affiliated to the University of Leeds in 1904. During the First World War (1914–1918), Midland Baptist College was closed and Rawdon acquired most of its assets. At the start of the Second World War (1939–1945), the college had 30 men, but there were only four in 1944, so the college closed until 1946. In 1961, Rawdon was merged with Manchester College to create the new Northern Baptist College, which was based in the Manchester premises.

Between 1964 and 1975, the college was used to house students of the Trinity and All Saints' Teacher Training College. In 1980, the college building was converted into 18 domestic residences. The site, containing other buildings, is known as Larchwood. In September 2010, a blue plaque was erected on Woodlands Drive to commemorate the former college.

== Alumni ==
- Carey Bonner (1859–1938) was General Secretary of the National Sunday School Union from 1900 until 1929 and Joint Secretary of the World Sunday School Association. He trained as a missionary at Rawdon.
- H. E. Crudgington (1852–1931) was a Baptist missionary from Ireland who was active in the Congo region before the Congo Free State was established. He was trained at Rawdon.
- George Howells (1871–1955) was a Welsh academic and writer, Principal of Serampore College, India from 1907 to 1932. He was lecturer in Hebrew at Rawdon Baptist College from 1932 to 1935.
- David Syme Russell (1916–2010) was a distinguished theologian and author, a Principal of Rawdon College
- Charles John Sutherland (1931–2020) Baptist Minister, Royal Air Force Chaplain, and Wiltshire Fire Brigade Chaplain.

== Sources ==
- "Blue plaque to tell history of gothic baptist college", Yorkshire Post, 2 September 2010
- McIntyre, Annette, "History of Rawdon's Baptist Training College and Chapel", Wharfedale Observer
- Moore, Joanne (1 July 2020), "Former Devizes Baptist minister and fire service chaplain dies", Wiltshire Gazette and Herald
- Our History, Northern Baptist College
- Rawdon Baptist College, Aireborough Historical Society
- Sell, Alan P. F. (2009-11-01), Philosophy, Dissent and Nonconformity, 1689-1920, Wipf & Stock Publishers, ISBN 978-1-60899-101-3
- Stonelake, Alfred R.; Coxill, H. Wakelin (10 November 1948), "CRUDGINGTON (H. E.)" (PDF), Biographie Coloniale Belge (in French), vol. II, Inst. roy. colon. belge, pp. col. 210-212
