= David Syme Russell =

David Syme Russell CBE
- Born: 21 November 1916; Glasgow, Scotland
- Died: 8 November 2010 (aged 93); Bristol, United Kingdom

David Syme Russell CBE (21 November 1916 – 8 November 2010) was a British theologian and author, former Principal of Rawdon College, Leeds, and General Secretary of the Baptist Union of Great Britain.

== Early life and career ==
David Syme Russell was born in Glasgow in 1916. His father was a joiner, working on the River Clyde. As a child, Russell showed promise as a footballer and completed trials for the Scottish schoolboys' side and at Queen's Park. Heavily involved with Cambuslang Baptist Church, he later recounted that he knew even as a child that he would end up in ministry.

A pupil of Hamilton Academy, Russell then entered Trinity College, Glasgow, before continuing his studies at Regent's Park College, Oxford.

Having attended the World Conference of Christian Youth both in 1939 and after the war, learning the realities of Auschwitz had a tremendous effect on him throughout his career.

Russell's first charge was as pastor at the Castlegate Church, Berwick, and between 1945 and 1951 he was minister in Acton, London, where in his final year there he conducted the funeral of the Foreign Secretary, Ernest Bevin, preaching to a congregation including the cabinet of the Attlee government.

== Later career ==
In 1953, Russell was appointed Principal, Rawdon College, the Baptist college at Leeds, England, and was much involved in the merging of Rawdon College with the Northern College, Manchester, in 1964, the merged colleges becoming the Northern Baptist College of which he was Joint Principal.

Becoming active in the European Baptist Federation and the Human Rights Programme of the Conference of European Churches, Russell was to advocate human rights in meetings with communist authorities and managed to secure funding for a translation into Russian of William Barclay's New Testament commentaries. He travelled widely in eastern Europe and Africa.

Russell was appointed General Secretary of the Baptist Union of Great Britain in 1967, a position he was to hold until his retirement in 1982. Among other appointments, he also served as Moderator of the Free Church Federal Council (1973–74) and as its president (1983–84).

In 1967 Russell was awarded the degree of Doctor of Letters from the University of Glasgow and in 1982 was invested Commander of the Order of the British Empire.

Russell married Marion Campbell in 1943, the couple having a son and daughter. Retiring in 1982 he moved to Bristol where he died, aged 93, in 2010.

== Published works ==
Russell was the author of numerous works, writing six of his fourteen published books during his retirement. He also made significant contributions to the Encyclopædia Britannica. Among his published works:

- Between the Testaments (1960)
- The Method and Message of Jewish Apocalyptic: 200 BC – AD 100 (1964)
- Jews from Alexander to Herod (1975)
- Daniel (with John C. L. Gibson, 1981)
- The Old Testament Pseudepigrapha: Patriarchs and Prophets in Early Judaisim (1987)
- Daniel: An Active Volcano: Reflections on the Book of Daniel (1987)
- Divine Disclosure: An Introduction to Jewish Apocalyptic (1992)
- Prophecy and the Apocalyptic Dream: Protest and Promise (1994)
