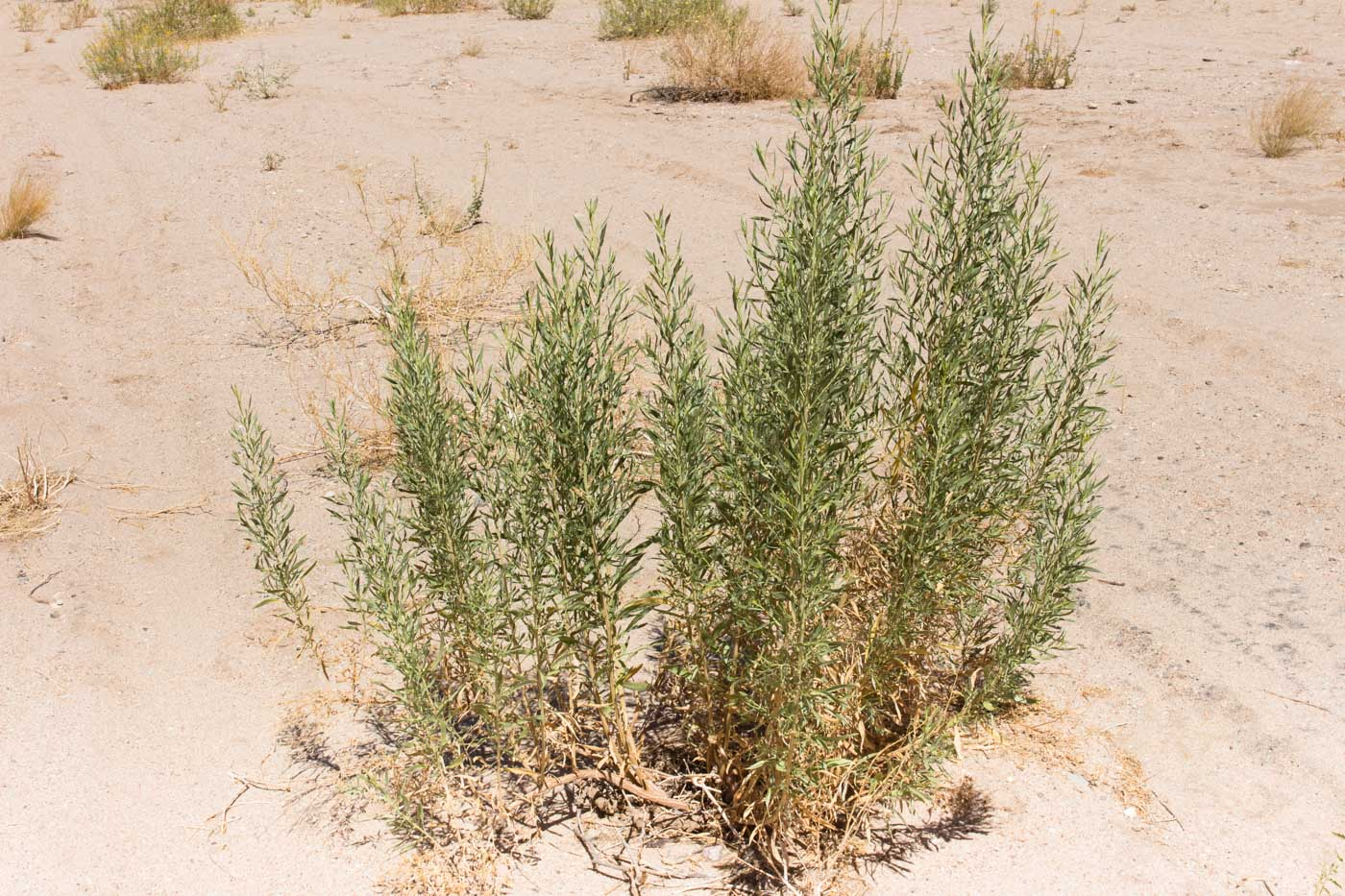

Scientific classification
- Kingdom: Plantae
- Clade: Embryophytes
- Clade: Tracheophytes
- Clade: Angiosperms
- Clade: Eudicots
- Clade: Asterids
- Order: Asterales
- Family: Asteraceae
- Subfamily: Asteroideae
- Tribe: Inuleae
- Genus: Pechuel-loeschea; O.Hoffm.
- Species: P. leubnitziae

Binomial name
- Pechuel-loeschea leubnitziae O.Hoffm.

Synonyms
- Piptocarpha leubnitziae Kuntze; Pluchea leubnitziae (Kuntze) N.E.Br.

= Pechuel-loeschea =

Species of flowering plant

Pechuel-loeschea (common names: stinkbush, sweatbush, or bitterbos) is a monotypic genus of African plants in the elecampane tribe within the sunflower family, and named after the German plant collector and geographer Eduard Pechuël-Loesche (1840–1913).

The only known species is Pechuel-loeschea leubnitziae, (or 'wild sage') which is native to Angola, Botswana, Eswatini, Mozambique, Namibia, Zimbabwe and the Cape Provinces and the Northern Provinces, (in South Africa). The Latin specific epithet of leubnitziae refers to Leubnitzia, the maiden name of Pechuel-Loesche's wife.

== Description ==
Strongly aromatic shrubby perennial herb. It grows up to 1.3 m (4 ft 3 in) tall. Most parts are densely grey-velvety and with short glandular hairs. It has alternately arranged leaves, which are (sub)sessile (without a leaf stalk). They are narrowly obovate-elliptic in shape and about 4.5 cm (2 in) long and 0.7 cm wide. They are velvety-grey on both leaf surfaces with a midrib prominent also on both surfaces. The margin is entire (smooth). It blooms between March and July. It has a capitula (a dense cluster of sessile or subsessile flowers) which are terminal (at the end) of 1–3 in the leaf axils. They more or less funnel-shaped and up to 1.3 cm long. The involucral scales (surround the flower head) are greyish glandular and hairy. The florets are purple with the central ray florets absent.

== Habitat ==
It is found growing in alkaline and sandy soils in dry wooded grassland or open woodland. It is often found in large amount growing along roadsides and disturbed areas.
