= Wainsgate Baptist Church =

Coordinates: 53.7555°N 2.0041°W

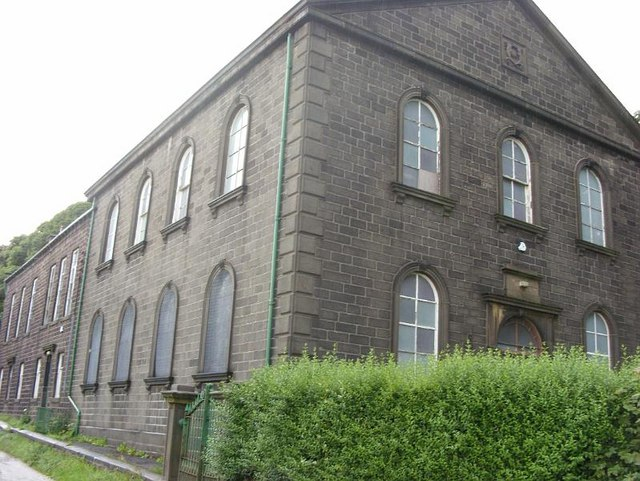
- Wainsgate Baptist Church

- Location in West Yorkshire
- OS grid reference: SD 998 288
- Location: Hebden Bridge, West Yorkshire
- Country: England
- Denomination: Baptist
- Website: Wainsgate Church

Architecture
- Functional status: Redundant
- Heritage designation: Grade II*
- Designated: 29 April 1982
- Architectural type: Church
- Groundbreaking: 1859
- Completed: 1860
- Closed: 2001

Specifications
- Materials: Stone with slate roof

Wainsgate Chapel is a redundant Baptist chapel standing in an elevated position above the town of Hebden Bridge, West Yorkshire, England (grid reference SD998288). The chapel and its attached school are recorded in the National Heritage List for England as a designated Grade II* listed building. The chapel is managed by the Historic Chapels Trust.

== History ==
The church was founded for the Particular Baptists in 1750. It was created as a consequence of the 18th-century Evangelical Revival and was inspired by Rev William Grimshaw, the incumbent of Haworth Parish Church. Its first minister was Richard Smith from Barnoldswick, and he was succeeded in 1764 by John Fawcett. In 1772 Fawcett wrote the words of the hymn "Blessed Be the Tie that Binds". The present chapel was built in 1859–60 and its furnishings were improved in the 1890s. The building attached to the back of the chapel was originally the manse, and in 1890 it was adapted for use as a school. The church closed in 2001, and in 2004 the Historic Chapels Trust took over its care.

== Architecture ==
=== Structure ===
The church is constructed in hammer-dressed stone, with ashlar dressings, and rusticated quoins. It has a slate roof, and is in two storeys. The entrance front is in three bays. The doorway is in the centre of the lower storey and has panelled pilasters. Over the door is a fanlight with spandrels that is surmounted by a moulded cornice, and above this is a plaque bearing the date 1859. On each side of the door is a round-headed window and there are three similar windows in the upper storey, over which is a pedimented gable. The chapel stretches back for four bays and contains similar windows to those in the entrance front. The school continues from the back of the chapel. At the far end of the school are doorways and three-light windows. In the gable is a Venetian window.

=== Fittings and furniture ===
The first three bays inside the church contain a curved gallery with curved pews. In the furthest bay is the organ, the pulpit, and a platform surrounded by wooden rails containing the communion table. Above these is a barrel roof painted with stars on an azure background. The pulpit was added to the church in 1891. It is octagonal and built in alabaster and marbles of different colours, decorated with shallow reliefs. It was designed by Anthony Welsh. The communion table dates from 1896. The rails surrounding the platform on which it stands are in oak, they have barley-twist balusters, and were made by J. W. Mitchell of Halifax. The windows contain stained glass made by the Powell Brothers of Leeds. In the centre of the ceiling is a pierced-work rose vent. Also in the church are monuments to Richard Smith and John Fawcett.

== External features ==
In the graveyard is the tomb of John Fawcett who died in 1817. It is constructed in ashlar stone and consists of a chest tomb on a plinth, and on its top is an overlapping slab bearing inscriptions. The tomb is surrounded by a low stone wall on which are cast iron railings with spear finials. It is designated as a Grade II listed building. Also in the graveyard are First World War graves.

== Present day ==
Repairs have been made to the church and the school, and concerts and other events are organised in the venue.

== See also ==
- List of chapels preserved by the Historic Chapels Trust
- Birchcliffe Baptist Church
