= Birchcliffe Baptist Church =

Coordinates: 53°44′36.51″N 2°0′31.57″W

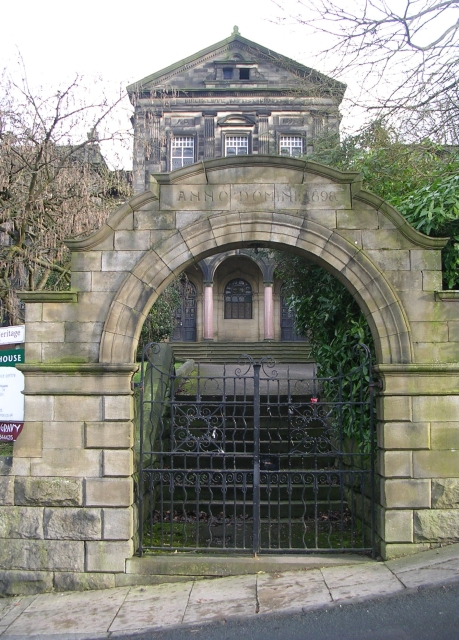
- Entrance to Birchcliffe Centre (2009)

- Location in West Yorkshire
- OS grid reference: SD 99521 27455
- Location: Hebden Bridge, West Yorkshire
- Country: England

Architecture
- Heritage designation: Grade II

Birchcliffe Baptist Church is a redundant Baptist chapel in the town of Hebden Bridge, West Yorkshire, England. It was founded by Daniel Taylor in 1764.

In 1807 a splinter group left to found Mount Zion Baptist Church, Slack, Heptonstall as they were unhappy with the ordination of a new minister, Henry Hollinrake.

Three churches called Birchcliffe have existed on the site: the second was built in 1825, and demolished in 1933; the third and current building was built further down the hill and opened on 31 October 1899. It closed for worship in the 1970s.

Today the building is Grade II listed and is known as the Birchcliffe Centre. Little remains of the original chapel buildings, aside from part of the school building and the graveyard.

== See also ==
- Wainsgate Baptist Church
