= John Fawcett (theologian) =

British theologican and hymnwriter (1739–1817)

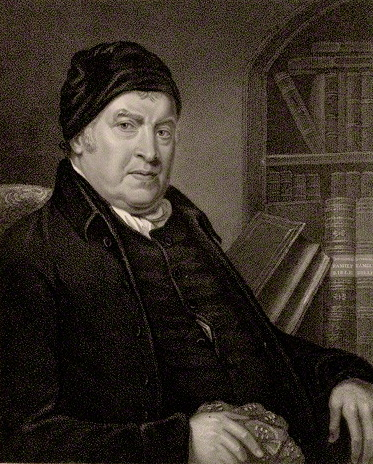
John Fawcett in 1814

John Fawcett (6 January 1739 – 25 July 1817) was a British-born Baptist theologian, pastor and hymn writer.

== Early years ==
Fawcett was born on 6 January 1739 in Lidget Green, Bradford. In 1762, Fawcett joined the Methodists, but three years later, he united with the Baptist Church and became pastor of Wainsgate Baptist Church in Hebden Bridge, West Yorkshire, England.

In 1769, he co-founded the Heptonstall Book Society; he later co-founded Brearly Hall academy to be used to train Particular Baptist preachers.

== "Tie That Binds" ==
Fawcett served at Hebden Bridge for seven years, despite a small income and a growing family. When he received a call in 1772 to the large and influential Carter's Lane Baptist Church in London he planned to accept the call. But at the last minute he changed his mind, and remained at Wainsgate where his salary was £25 a year. To commemorate this event, in 1782 he wrote the words to his hymn "Blest Be the Tie that Binds", his most famous hymn by far.

== Later life, and death ==
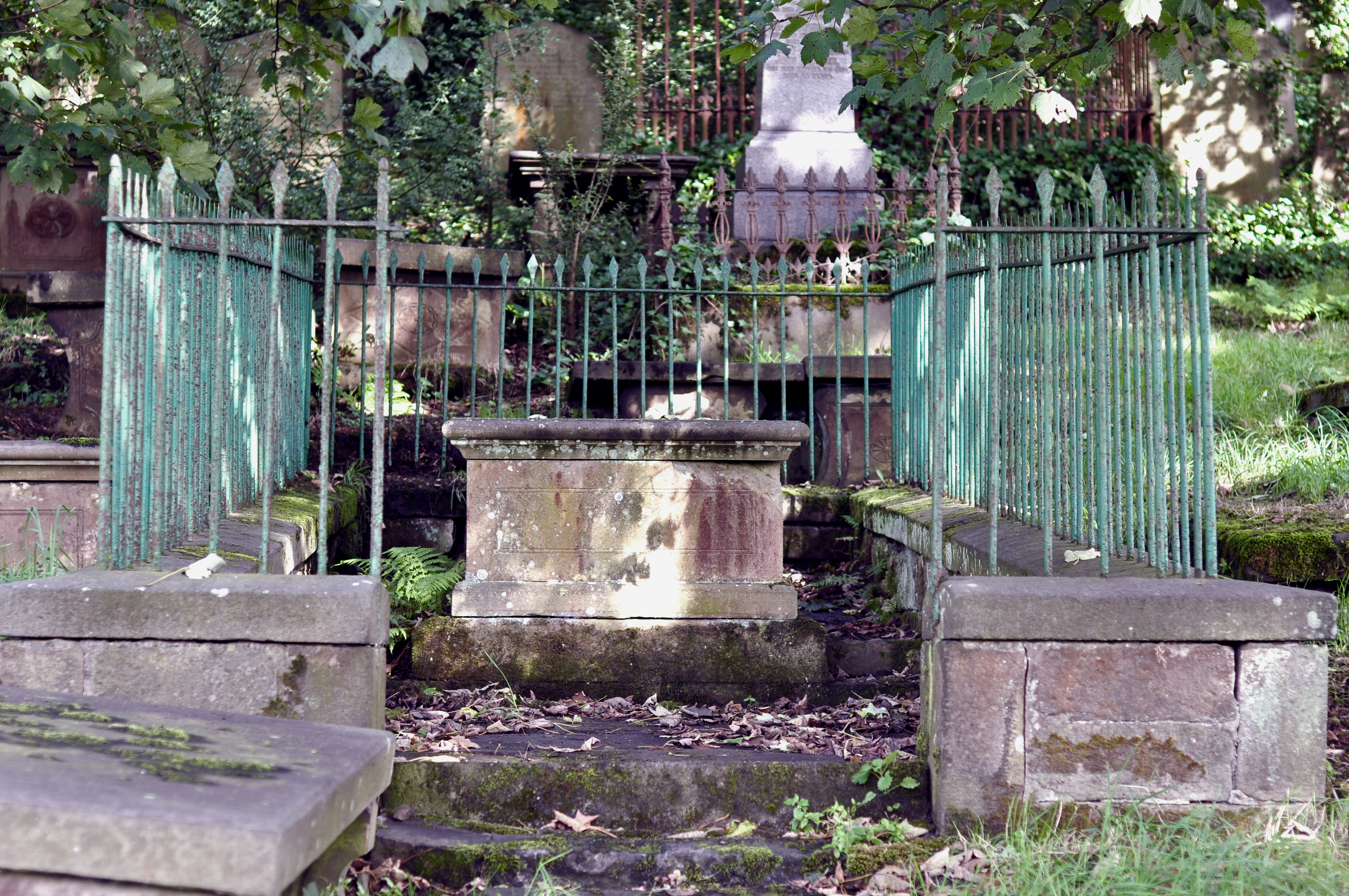
Fawcett's grave in the graveyard of Wainsgate Baptist Church

In 1777, a new chapel was built for him at Hebden Bridge, and about the same time he opened a school at Brearley Hall, his place of residence. In 1793, he was invited to become president of the Baptist Academy at Bristol, but declined. In 1811, he received a Doctor of Divinity degree from America.

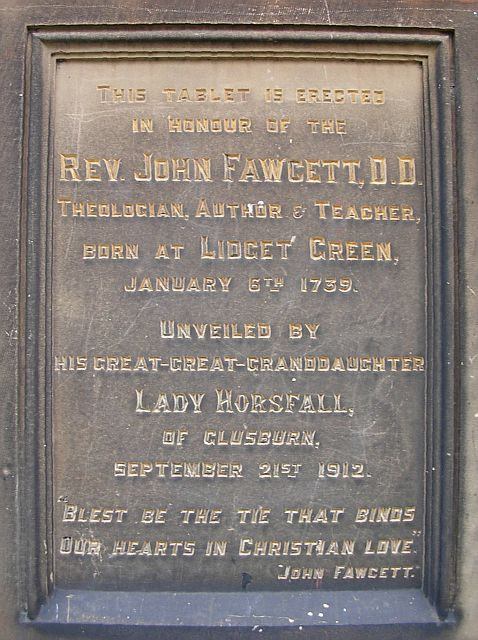
1912 plaque commemorating Fawcett, located in the New Testament Church of God in Bradford. According to the plaque, Fawcett was born on 6 January 1739 in Lidget Green, Bradford.

Fawcett died in 1817 at the age of 78.

== Publications ==
Fawcett was the author of a number of religious prose works, several of which attained a large circulation.

- A summary of the evidences of Christianity (1797)

Poetic publications:

- Poetic Essays (1767)
- The Christian's Humble Plea; a poem in answer to Dr. Priestly against the Divinity of our Lord Jesus Christ (1772)
- Three hymns in the Gospel Magazine (1777)
- The Death of Euminio, A Divine Poem (1779)
- Another Poem suggested by the decease of a friend, "The Reign of Death" (1780)
- Hymns adapted to the circumstances of Public Worship and Private Devotion, Leeds, G. Wright and Son (1782)

One of Fawcett's hymns, "Humble souls who seek salvation" with the heading, "Invitation to follow the Lamb", (Matt 3:15) had the following note: "The author lays claim to this hymn, 'tho it has appeared under another name: he hopes that the insertion of it, and the following, (Ye saints with one accord) will give no offence to those of his friends who are differently minded, as to the subject to which they refer. Obviously someone's name had been wrongly given as the author of the hymn."

Fawcett's hymn in Spiritual Songs is no. 267, "All fulness resides in Jesus our Head". The original text of this hymn is in Baptist Psalms and Hymns, 1858–80) The first line is "A Fulness resides in Jesus our Head" and is rendered in this way in George Vicesimus Wigram's 1856 Little Flock Hymnbook, and in J.N.D's 1881 edition; also in William Kelly's 1894 edition. T. H. Reynolds and W. J. Hocking's editions have "All fulness resides etc."
