= Old Portsmouth =

District of Portsmouth, Hampshire, England

Coordinates: 50.790°N 1.105°W

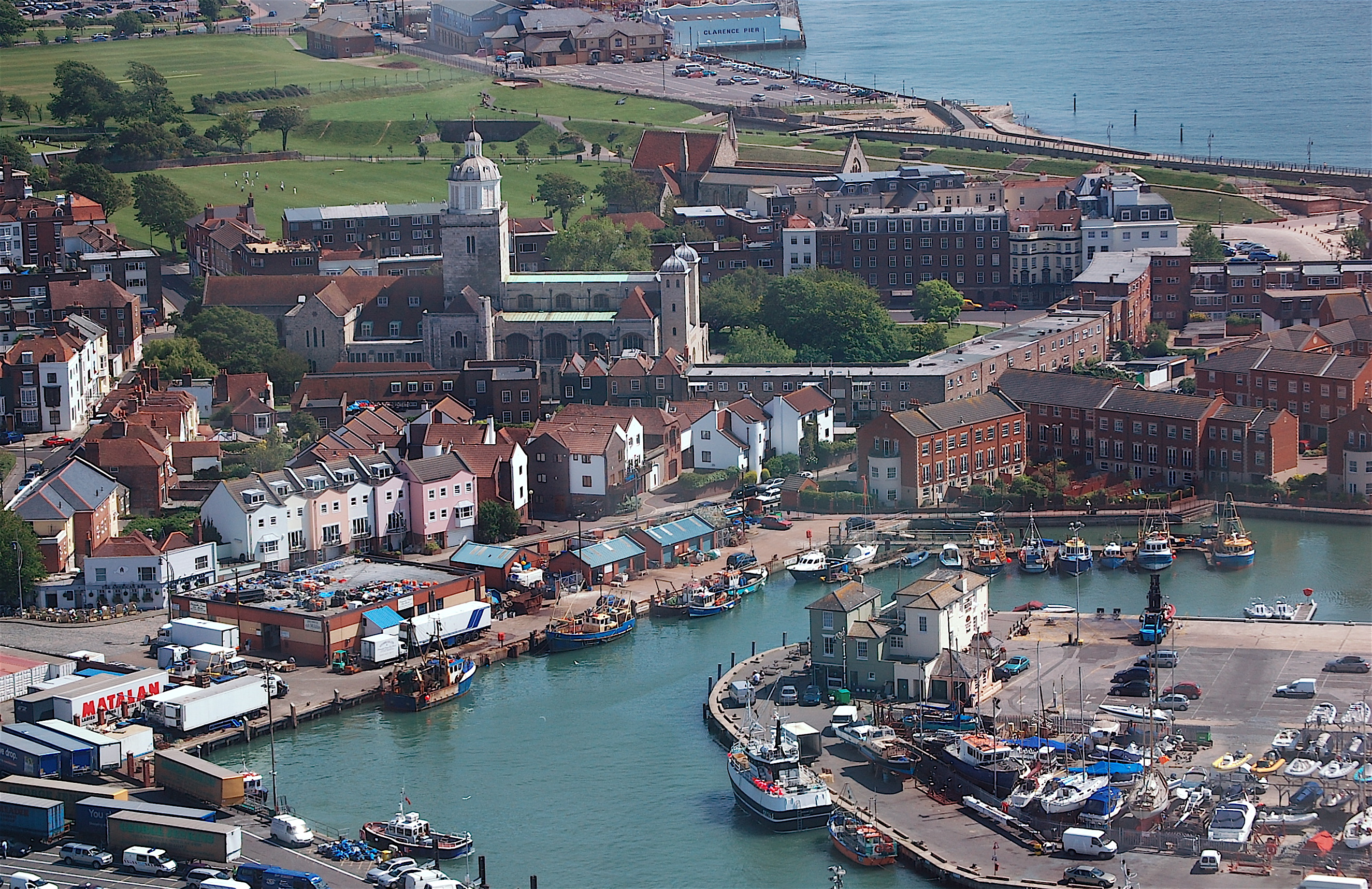

- Location within Hampshire
- OS grid reference: SZ633994
- Unitary authority: Portsmouth
- Ceremonial county: Hampshire
- Region: South East
- Country: England
- Sovereign state: United Kingdom
- Postcode district: PO1
- Dialling code: 023
- Police: Hampshire and Isle of Wight
- Fire: Hampshire and Isle of Wight
- Ambulance: South Central
- UK Parliament: Portsmouth South

Old Portsmouth is a district of the city of Portsmouth. It is the area covered by the original medieval town of Portsmouth as planned by Jean de Gisors. It is situated in the south west corner of Portsea Island. The roads still largely follow their original layout. The district was historically referred to as Portsmouth itself but with the growth of nearby settlements (Portsea, Landport and Southsea), the Municipal Corporation Act of 1835 formed the settlements under an enlarged Portsmouth and the district became referred to as Old Portsmouth.

The area contains many historic buildings including: Portsmouth Cathedral, Royal Garrison Church, The John Pounds Memorial Church (Unitarian), the Square Tower and Round Tower and Point Barracks, Portsmouth Point and the entrance to the harbour. George Villiers, 1st Duke of Buckingham was assassinated in the Greyhound Pub in 1628. The area also has several historic pubs including the Bridge Tavern, Still and West, Spice Island Inn, and the Dolphin. The building Spice Island Inn occupies was previously two separate pubs.

The area is also home to Portsmouth's small fishing fleet and fish market at Camber docks.

== History ==
Archaeological evidence from the Bronze Age era exists of early settlement in the area of old Portsmouth. The Domesday book of 1086 does not record a settlement, although there were three manor sites on Portsea Island. However, by 1180, the area that became Old Portsmouth (the manor of Buckland) had passed into ownership of John de Gisors, a Norman merchant. Establishing a settlement around the sheltered lagoon (that evolved into the 'Camber'), he granted land for the building of the Church of St Thomas (which eventually became the Cathedral) in 1185. Much of the original layout of the medieval town street plan is preserved in the present street plan of the area. On 2 May 1194, King Richard I granted the town the right to hold a fair or market. On 25 October 1200, King John I granted the old town further Municipal rights and privileges in a new charter.

By 1229, a monastic hospital had been established in the town. It was named the 'Domus Dei' and was administered by the Bishop of Winchester. The site later became home to the Governors of Portsmouth. The remains of the hospital church now form the historic core of the Garrison Church. The Governor's House later hosted Charles II of England and Catherine of Braganza for their first meeting after their marriage treaty in 1662.

Old Portsmouth was attacked by the French on several occasions during the medieval period so by the 15th century, defensive walls had been constructed. The Round Tower was commenced in 1417 to defend the town and harbour entrance. In 1494, the Square Tower was also constructed to improve the defences of Old Portsmouth.

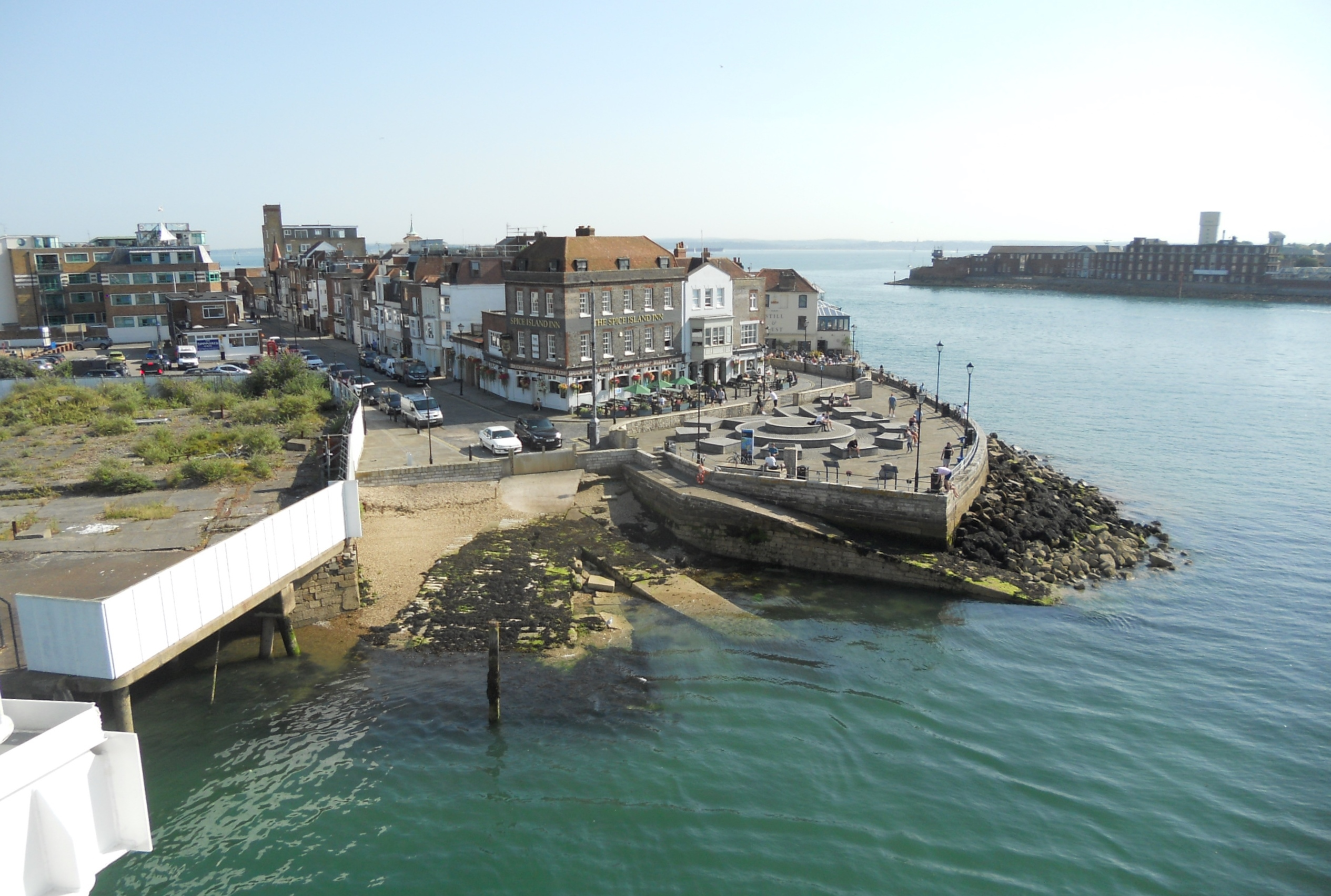
The Point (July 2021)

In 1627, Charles I granted an expanded town charter. The defences of the town were further improved in the 17th and 18th centuries, with an enlarged defensive walls, new ramparts and ditches. These included construction of several new decorative gates guarding entrance to Old Portsmouth that included King James's Gate (1687) across Broad Street, the Landport Town Gate (1760) and King George's Gate (1743). Several smaller sally ports and gates were also in existence. The Long Curtain, gun battery and ravelin were added following the designs of Dutch Engineer Sir Benard de Golme in the 1660s and 1670s.

In 1768, an Act of Parliament was given for Old Portsmouth providing for public lighting, an official watch and town paving (completed in 1773 at a cost of £9000). Subsequent development expanded Portsmouth over Portsea Island with the historic settlement being referred to as 'Old Portsmouth' by 1828 when the historic boundaries were marked by an annual 'beating the bounds' ceremony.

In the Second World War Old Portsmouth was extensively damaged by german aerial attacks. On the night of the city's heaviest raid (10 January 1941), the Luftwaffe dropped 140 tonnes of high-explosive bombs which killed 171 people. Many houses and historic buildings in Old Portsmouth were damaged, and areas of Landport and large sections of Old Portsmouth entirely destroyed; the future site of Gunwharf Quays was razed to the ground. The George Hotel, an historic 18th century hotel was also destroyed (Nelson had stayed there before departing on his voyage which culminated in the Battle of Trafalgar in 1805).

Between 2020 and 2023, large scale significant coastal defence works were carried out on sections of the seafront between Old Portsmouth and Clarence Pier by Long Curtain Moat. These included a new seawall and pedestrian bridge to protect the seaward side of Old Portsmouth.

== Economy ==
Historically, many pubs and coffee houses have been located in Old Portsmouth. For example, in 1716 there were some 41 pubs, coffee houses and brandy establishments. In 2022, there were three pubs remaining on the Point in Old Portsmouth, specifically the Still & West, the Spice Island Inn and the Bridge Tavern. The Bridge Tavern was built in 1806 in the Camber beside the site of an early iron bridge (initially a lifting bridge, later replaced by a swing bridge, but now removed). Part of the outside of the building is decorated with a caricature by the artist Thomas Rowlandson (1756-1827).

Other pubs in Portsmouth outside the Point include the Dolphin, the Sally Port Inn, A Bar, the Pembroke and the Wellington. The Dolphin is thought to be one of Portsmouth's oldest pub buildings (1716).

Portsmouth Camber has a small commercial fishing port in operation.

The Ben Ainslie Racing HQ was a purpose built sailing centre built at the Camber in Old Portsmouth in 2015 but was vacated by the America's Cup team in 2021. The building is now used by several businesses including BAR Technologies who develop technological solutions for ships to comply with International Maritime Organization decarbonisation requirements.

== Education ==
St Judes is a primary school in Old Portsmouth on Nicolas Street.

The Portsmouth Grammar School is a private grammar school providing mixed education for ages 2 to 18 in Old Portsmouth, situated on the High Street and Museum Road. The grammar school opened in 1750 in Penny Street. In 1926, it moved to its current location occupying the former Cambridge Barracks buildings on the High Street.

== Landmarks and monuments ==
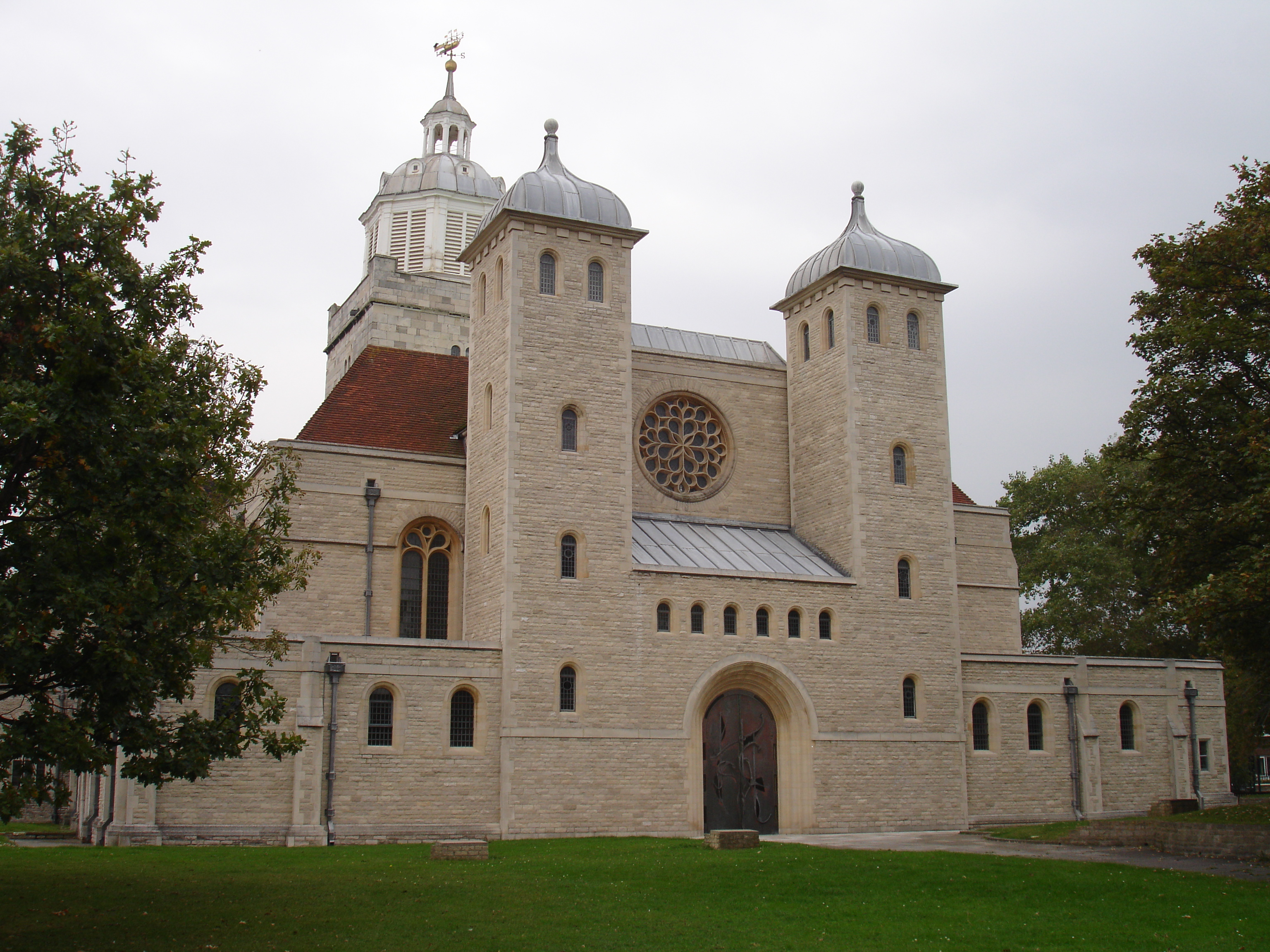
Portsmouth Cathedral in Old Portsmouth

Portsmouth Cathedral is an active cathedral with religious services and musical events. Parts of the cathedral date to the 12th century.

John Pounds Unitarian Church, garden and old house/workshop are located in Old Portsmouth. The old house/workshop is preserved as a museum.

The 'Hotwalls' are the name for the walled site and beach adjacent to the Point Battery. The arches of the battery are in use as artist studios and art shops.

There is a historic walking trail.

The Nelson Memorial is a listed statue dedicated to Horatio Nelson, 1st Viscount Nelson on Grand Parade in Old Portsmouth that was moved from a site in Pembroke Gardens.

The Pioneer Statue old Broad Street in Old Portsmouth is a 2001 monument on European immigration to the Americas. There is also a nearby Australian Settlers Memorial dedicated to Immigration to Australia that was unveiled by Elizabeth II in 1980 and is a companion piece to a memorial in Sydney.

The Hecla Monument is a large stone that provided cover for sailors from HMS Hecla during the Crimean War and was transported to Old Portsmouth as a monument.

== Community facilities ==
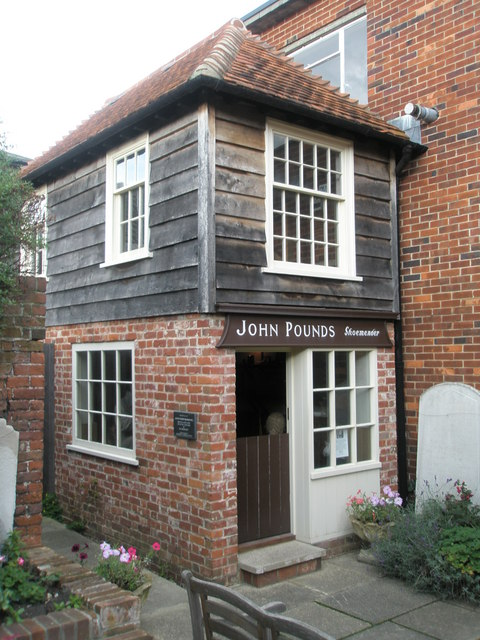
John Pounds workshop in Old Portsmouth

The Portsmouth Sailing Club has a waterfront site in Old Portsmouth and was founded in 1920.

There are three masonic lodges (257 Phoenix, 8285 Old Portsmouthian and 5151 Domus Dei) at the historic Phoenix Rooms in Old Portsmouth.

Pembroke Gardens is an outdoor bowling club.

== Notable residents ==
John Pounds, the founder of the Ragged Schools movement had a house and workshop in Old Portsmouth, where he gave education lessons to poor and orphaned children.
