= Fayt-lez-Manage =

Fayt-lez-Manage El Fayi-dlé-Manadje (Walloon)
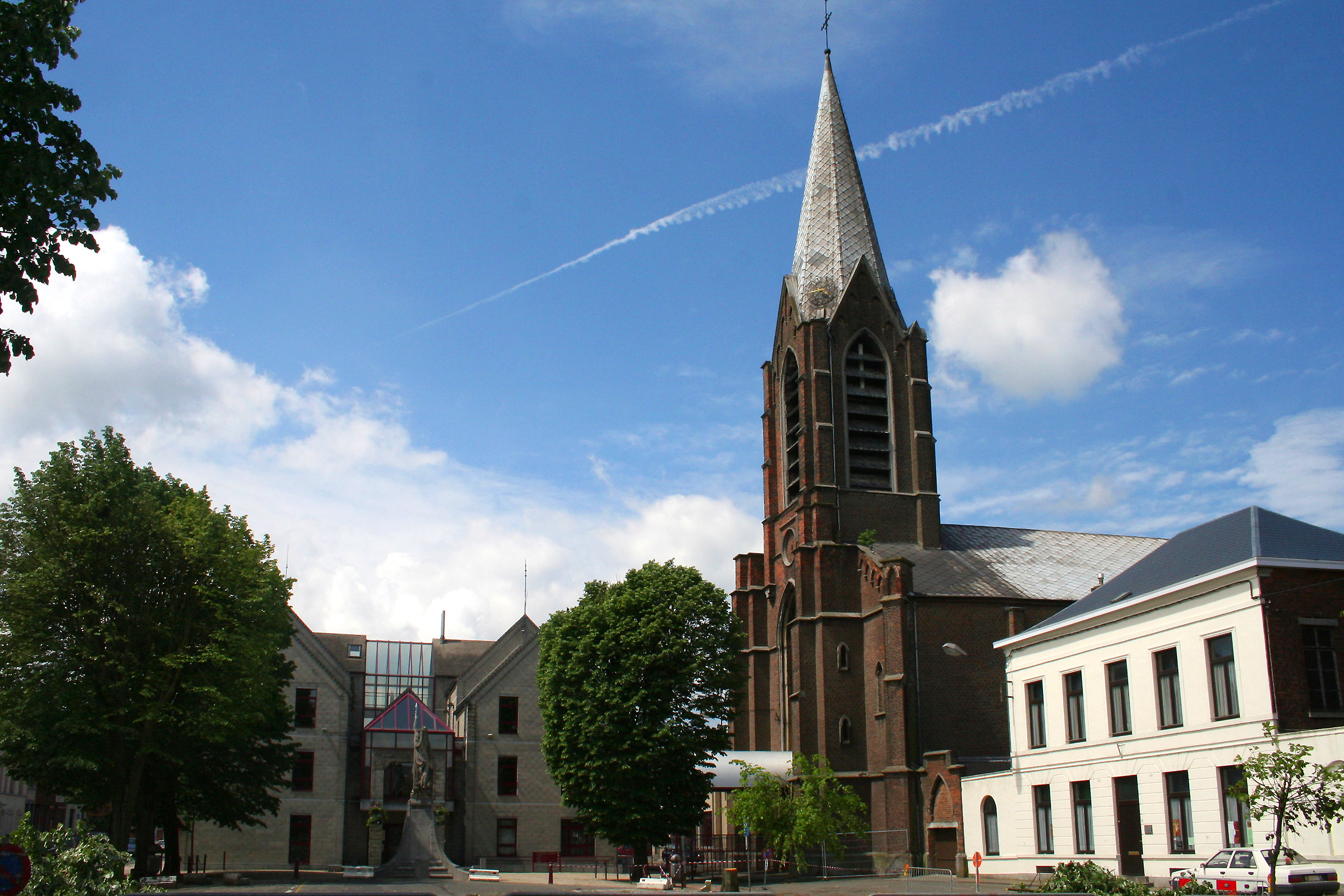
- Place Albert I

- Coat of arms

- Location within Belgium
- Coordinates: 50.4278°N 4.216°E
- Country: Belgium
- Region: Wallonia
- Province: Hainaut
- Municipality: Manage

Fayt-lez-Manage (French: [fa(j)ilemanaʒ], literally Fayt near Manage; Walloon: El Fayi-dlé-Manadje) is a town of Wallonia and a district of the municipality of Manage, located in the province of Hainaut, Belgium.

The name dates to 1920, previously it was called Fayt-lez-Seneffe. It was a municipality in its own right before the merger of the municipalities in 1977.

The locality is served by bus 30 Anderlues - Morlanwelz - La Louvière - Strépy-Bracquenies - Thieu.

== People ==
- Max Buset (1896–1959), deputy, first president of the Belgian Socialist Party
- Fernande Coulon (1901–1981), founder of the National League of Cooperators
- Victor Harou (1851–1923), explorer in the Congo

== Sources ==
- Pierret, Jean-Marie (1994), Phonétique historique du français et notions de phonétique générale (in French), Louvain-la-Neuve: Peeters, ISBN 978-90-6831-608-7
