= George Howells =

Welsh academic and writer

George Howells (11 May 1871 – 7 November 1955) was a Welsh academic and writer, who was Principal of Serampore College, India from 1907 to 1932.

== Life ==
Howells was born on 11 May 1871 in Cwm, Monmouthshire in south Wales. He was educated at schools in Cwm and Pengam before winning a scholarship to Regent's Park Baptist College, London. After graduating with a degree awarded by the University of London, he studied at the University of Oxford (at Mansfield College and Jesus College), at Christ's College, Cambridge and at the University of Tübingen, obtaining degrees from a total of four universities. He travelled to India in 1895 for the Baptist Missionary Society to deal with literary and educational work. In 1907, he became Principal of Serampore College, a post he held until 1932. During this time, he also served as a Fellow and examiner of the University of Calcutta (1913 to 1929) and was a member of the Bengal Legislative Council in 1918. After returning to Britain in 1932, he was lecturer in Hebrew at Rawdon Baptist College until 1935. He received honorary degrees from the University of St Andrews, Serampore College and the University of Wales. During his retirement, he moved to Castleton, south Wales and he died on 7 November 1955.

== Works ==
His writings included The Soul of India (1913), derived from lectures he delivered at the University of London, and The Story of Serampore (1927), of which he wrote the majority and edited the whole. He also wrote for Indian periodicals on problems in education and theology.
