= New Connexion of General Baptists =

Great Awakening British Baptist offshoot

The New Connexion of General Baptists was a General Baptist body in England, formed in 1770 inside the General Assembly of General Baptists, initially as a reform movement to advance orthodox and Great Awakening, evangelical ideas. The New Connexion fully joined the Baptist Union of Great Britain in 1891.

== History ==
Whilst the New Connexion of General Baptists officially owes its foundation to Daniel Taylor, the leading New Light General Baptist minister in England, it can be traced to General Baptist churches in the east Midlands loosely associated since the 1750s. Their main organization was the Barton Society, which was centered in the village of Barton-in-the-Beans, near Market Bosworth and included churches in Leicestershire, Nottinghamshire and Derbyshire.

In 1770, Daniel Taylor unified the Barton Society and all the other General Baptist churches, Old Light or New Light, disenchanted with heterodox beliefs inside the General Assembly into one group, forming the New Connexion of General Baptists in Leicestershire. The Great Awakening had exacerbated the orthodox Baptist churches’ frustration. In contrast to their heterodox counterparts, the “strong evangelistic zeal and strong corporate feeling” among them was “obviously a child of the Methodist Revival”.

The New Connexion was well organized from the outset and developed well in the emerging urban areas of the Industrial Revolution, particularly in the industrial Midlands. By 1817, the year after Taylor's death, the New Connexion had around 70 chapels.

== College ==
By 1798, the New Connexion of General Baptists had founded a dissenting college in Mile End, the east end of London, to educate Baptist ministers and lay preachers, mainly for ordination.

The college later moved to Wisbech, Cambridgeshire, in 1813 and became Wisbech General Baptist Academy. The college re-located in 1855 to Leicester and again in 1882 to Nottingham, becoming Midland Baptist College. The college closed around the time of the First World War and its assets were transferred to Rawdon Baptist College.

== Union with Particular Baptists ==
The Baptist Union of Great Britain, formed in 1812, did not include General Baptists. However, “in order to allow more churches to join, it had reduced its doctrinal basis to the bare minimum in 1832, simply asking for agreement in the sentiments usually denoted as evangelical. This had resulted in a number of churches from the New Connexion joining”.

After the Down Grade Controversy, which resulted in the defeat of those Calvinistic theological conservatives like Charles Spurgeon, skepticals of the value of modern biblical criticism, the path was open to greater unification. John Clifford, baptized at a General Baptist church in the New Connexion and ordained after studying at Midland Baptist College, became the President of the Baptist Union of Great Britain in 1888. Under his leadership, the General Baptists (New Connexion) completely merged with the Particular Baptists (Baptist Union) in 1891. No confession of faith was required from either side, Calvinist or Arminian. John Clifford also became the first President of the Baptist World Alliance, from 1905 to 1911.
