= Joseph Vandevelde =

Belgian soldier and explorer

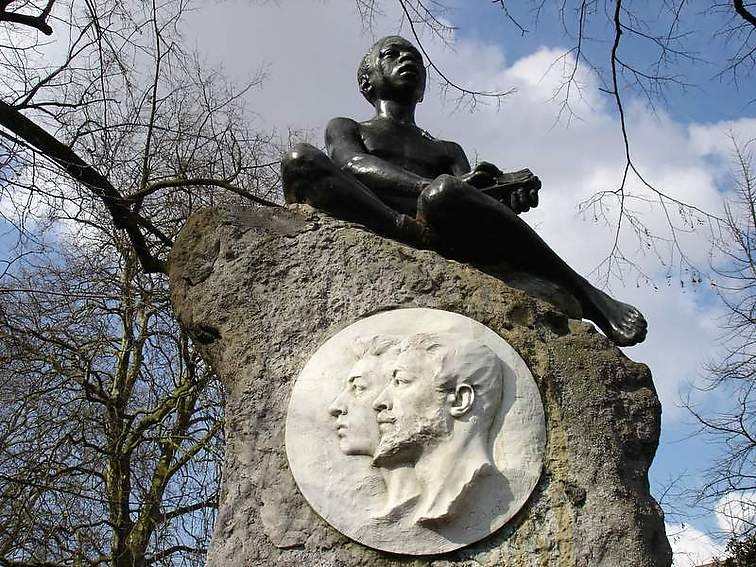
- Monument in Ghent to Jozef and Lieven Van de Velde, with the young Sakala
- Born: 5 January 1855; Ghent, Belgium
- Died: 23 May 1882 (aged 27); Isangila, Congo
- Occupations: Soldier and explorer

Joseph Vandevelde, or Jozef Van de Velde (5 January 1855 – 23 May 1882) was a Belgian soldier and explorer in the Congo before the Congo Free State was established.

== Life ==
Joseph Vandevelde was born in Ghent, Belgium, on 5 January 1855, son of Adolplie-François-Joseph Vandevelde and Colette-Jacqueline Vanderstraeten. On 21 July 1871 he enlisted as a private soldier in the 2nd Line Regiment. He was made a sergeant on 6 October 1872. He entered the Military School on 1 December 1874, and spent a year in infantry studies and then four years in specialized arms. On 1 January 1877 he was made sub-lieutenant and provisionally assigned to the artillery.

== Colonial career ==
On 10 May 1881 Vandevelde was seconded to the Military Cartographic Institute, and joined the service of the Comité d'Etudes du Haut-Congo for three years in support of the Congo expedition of Henry Morton Stanley. He was responsible for setting up a shipyard in Léopoldville for launching boats on the Congo above the cataracts. He spent a year at the marine engineering establishments, taking a practical course in mechanics and shipbuilding. He also made a study of the Congo in the places where it was navigable.

Vandevelde left for the Congo on 18 January 1882 accompanied by skilled maritime carpenters, following his brother Liévin Vandevelde, who had left for the Congo on 9 December 1881. He reached Banana on 5 March 1882. With his travelling companions, Edmond Hanssens, Théodore Nilis and Nicolas Grang, he went up the river to Vivi. In March 1883 there were rumors of a revolt, and Nilis, Vandevelde and Louis-Gustave Amelot went to come to the aid of Émile Parfonry, who was head of the Isangila station. With the arrival of reinforcements the problem was resolved. They found the reports had been exaggerated, and sailed upstream in the Royal to Manyanga.

Vandevelde then continued on to Léopoldville, where he fell ill with fever. He delayed returning to the coast for treatment since he was needed by Stanley on the upper Congo, but became so ill that he had to be carried in a hammock through difficult country to Vivi. He died on the way, on 23 May 1882, three days from Isangila. His carriers took his body on to Vivi, where it was buried.

== Sources ==
- Engels, A. (23 December 1946), "HANSSENS (Edmond-Winnie-Victor)", Biographie Coloniale Belge, vol. I, Inst. roy. colon. belge, pp. col. 479–493
- Engels, A. (31 July 1947), "AMELOT (Louis-Gustave)", Biographie Coloniale Belge (in French), vol. I, Inst. roy. colon. belge, pp. 22–24
- Engels, A.; Coosemans, M. (1947), "NILIS (Théodore-Victor-Edouard-Adolphe-Arthur)", Biographie Coloniale Belge (in French), vol. I, Inst. roy. colon. belge, pp. col.732–738
- Guébels, L. (27 April 1948), "VANDEVELDE (Joseph)" (PDF), Biographie Coloniale Belge (in French), vol. I, Inst. roy. colon. belge, pp. col. 927–929
