= John Pounds =

English teacher and creator of Ragged schools

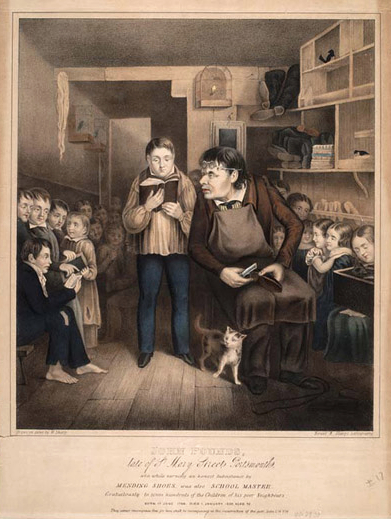
- Published by Bouvé & Sharp, 221 Washington St., Boston, c. 1843-1845
- Born: 17 June 1766; Portsmouth, England
- Died: 1 January 1839 (aged 72); Portsmouth, England

John Pounds (17 June 1766 – 1 January 1839) was an English teacher, the man most responsible for the creation of the concept of Ragged schools. After Pounds' death, Thomas Guthrie (often credited with the creation of Ragged Schools) wrote his Plea for Ragged Schools and proclaimed John Pounds as the originator of this idea.

== Life ==
Pounds was born in Portsmouth and was severely crippled in his mid-teens, from falling into a dry dock at Portsmouth Dockyard, where he was apprenticed as a shipwright. He could no longer work at the dockyard, and from then onward made his living as a shoemaker.

He would scour the streets of Portsmouth looking for children who were poor and homeless, taking them into his small workshop and teaching them basic reading, writing, and arithmetic skills. This small workshop was often host to as many as 40 children at any one time. John carried with him simple food items like baked potatoes to attract children.

Many years after his death, John Pounds has become a local hero in his birthplace of Portsmouth, winning a "Man of the Millennium" award in 1999 from a local newspaper, ahead of nationally more famous local heroes including Admiral Lord Nelson and Charles Dickens.

A unitarian chapel named in his memory stands in Old Portsmouth and his life was celebrated in a sacred cantata Greatheart: The Story of John Pounds, by the Rev. Carey Bonner. In 2005, the John Pounds Centre was opened in Queen Street, Portsmouth to encourage "a happier and healthier lifestyle, should that be through learning, physical or social activities." Until 1975 there was a girl's secondary modern in Portsea named after him: it is now a community centre.
