= Manage, Belgium =

Municipality in Hainaut Province, Wallonia, Belgium

Manage Manadje (Walloon)
- Municipality
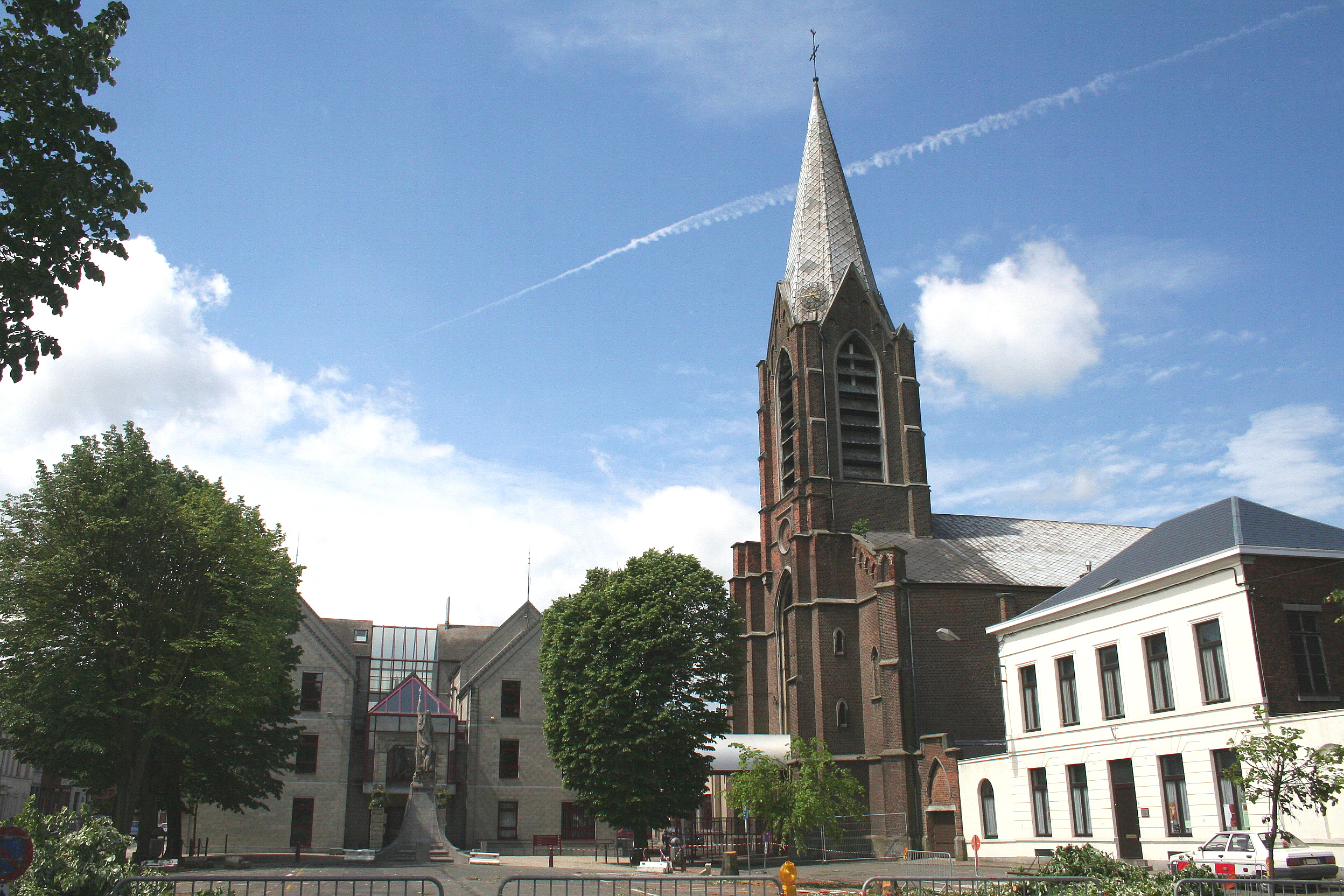

- Flag Coat of arms

- Location of Manage in Hainaut
- Interactive map of Manage
- Location in Belgium
- Coordinates: 50°30′N 04°14′E
- Country: Belgium
- Community: French Community
- Region: Wallonia
- Province: Hainaut
- Arrondissement: Soignies

Government
  - Mayor: Bruno Pozzoni (PS)
  - Governing party: PS

Area
  - Total: 19.43 km^{2} (7.50 sq mi)

Population (2018-01-01)
  - Total: 23,122
  - Density: 1,190/km^{2} (3,082/sq mi)
- Postal codes: 7170
- NIS code: 55086
- Area codes: 064
- Website: www.manage-commune.be

Manage (French pronunciation: [manaʒ]; Walloon: Manadje) is a municipality of Wallonia located in the province of Hainaut, Belgium.

On January 1, 2006, Manage had a total population of 22,341. The total area is 19.60 km^{2} which gives a population density of 1,140 inhabitants per km^{2}.

The municipality consists of the following districts: Bellecourt, Bois-d'Haine, Fayt-lez-Manage, La Hestre, and Manage.
