= Daniel Taylor (Baptist pastor) =

British Baptist minister

The Reverend Daniel Taylor
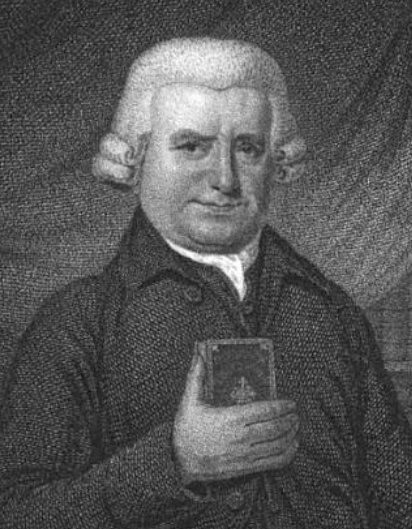
- Engraving of Daniel Taylor, 1816
- Born: Daniel Taylor; 21 December 1738; Northowram, Yorkshire, Kingdom of Great Britain
- Died: 26 November 1816 (aged 77); London, United Kingdom of Great Britain and Ireland
- Occupations: Minister; theologian; writer
- Notable work: A Compendious View
- Spouse(s): Elizabeth Saltonstall (m. 1764; died 1793) Elizabeth Newton (m. 1794; died 1809) Mary Toplis (m. 1811; died 1812) Mrs. Saunders (m. 1816)
- Children: 13

Religious life
- Religion: Christianity
- Denomination: Baptist
- Church: Protestant

Daniel Taylor (1738 – 1816) was a British revivalist General Baptist minister, theologian, and writer. Taylor was the founder of the New Connexion of General Baptists, and was a great supporter of the Great Awakening, working with Andrew Fuller, William Carey, and other Particular Baptists.

== From Methodist to General Baptist ==
Dan Taylor was born at Sourmilk Hall, Northowram, near Halifax, Yorkshire, on 21 December 1738 to Azor Taylor and his wife Mary (Willey). Like his father he was a coal-miner who joined the Wesleyan Methodists in 1761, during his early twenties. Whilst never straying from Wesley's Arminianism, Taylor quickly tired of what he saw as Wesley's authoritianism. He determined to become a Baptist and set off for Boston, where there was a General Baptist church; on the way he came across a Baptist church at Gamston and in February 1763 was baptised there. Taylor was ordained a Baptist minister and had begun organising the Birchcliffe Baptists, a grouping of Nonconformists around Hebden Bridge. The following year the Birchcliffe group built their own chapel. Taylor, a young man used to manual labour, quarried the stone himself.

Building the chapel proved an expensive burden, so Taylor travelled on foot to Leicestershire in search of support. Among the independent Baptist churches throughout the east Midlands, there was a great deal of disillusionment with the current state of the General Assembly of General Baptists. Many Baptist churches were becoming increasingly liberal in their doctrine, obliging the more orthodox and the more evangelical among them to reconsider their communion.

== Founding the New Connexion of General Baptists ==
In June 1770, Dan Taylor was able to bring together many of those Arminian Baptists disenchanted with the "Old General Baptists" in "The New Connexion of General Baptists". Well organised from the outset, the Connexion thrived, particularly in the industrial areas of the English Midlands. By 1817, a year after Taylor's death, the Connection had 70 chapels.

Taylor ministered to the Birchcliffe Baptist Church for twenty years until 1783 when he moved to a chapel in Wandsworth, south west London.

In 1798, the Academy of the New Connexion of General Baptists was founded in Mile End, east end of London. In 1813 it moved to Wisbech, Cambridgeshire.

Daniel Taylor's younger brother, John Taylor, was also a Baptist pastor.

== Bibliography ==
- Dan Taylor (1775). Fundamentals of Religion in Faith and Practice. Leeds.
- Daniel Taylor (1777). An humble essay on Christian baptism (2 ed.). London: J. W. Pasham.
- Daniel Taylor (1780). An Humble Essay on the right use of Earthly Treasure. In three letters to a fellow-labourer in the work of the Ministry (2 ed.).
- Dan Taylor (1782). The Stroke of Death Practically Improved. London.
- Daniel Taylor (1784). Our Saviour's Commission to his Ministers, explained and improved. Leeds: Thomas Wright.
- Dan Taylor (1784). The Consistent Christian; Or the Truth and Peace, Holiness, Unanimity, Steadfastness and Zeal. Leeds: Griffith Wright.
- Dan Taylor (1787). A Second Dissertation on Singing in the Worship of God. London.
- Daniel Taylor (1788). Observations on the Rev. Andrew Fuller's Reply to Philanthropos. London: T. Bloom.
- D. Taylor (1789). The Eternity of Future Punishment Asserted and Improved. A Discourse on Matt. Xxv. 46. London: Cicero Press.
- D. Taylor (1790). An Essay on the truth and inspiration of the Holy Scriptures. London.
- Dan Taylor (1792). A Compendious View of the Nature and Importance of Christian Baptism (3 ed.). London.
- D. Taylor (1794). A Sermon [on Ps. xlviii. 14] occasioned by the death of Mrs. Elizabeth Taylor ... October 22, 1793 ... with a short account of her life and character. London.
