= Adda River (South Sudan) =

River in Western Bahr el Ghazal, South Sudan

- Location within South Sudan

Physical characteristics
- Mouth
  - coordinates: 9.815290°N 24.841414°E

Basin features
- River system: Bahr al-Arab. White Nile

The Adda River is a river of South Sudan, a tributary of the Bahr al-Arab.

The river flows through the Western Bahr el Ghazal, South Sudan. The average elevation is 499 metres (1,637 ft) above sea level. It joins the Umbelasha River opposite the town of Radom, Sudan, to form the Bahr al-Arab, which defines the border between South Sudan and Sudan.
