= Thomas J. Comber =

English Baptist missionary in the Congo

Thomas James Comber
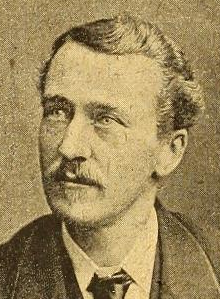
- Born: 7 November 1852; Camberwell, London, England
- Died: 27 June 1887 (aged 34); Loango, Republic of Congo
- Occupation: Missionary
- Known for: Work in the Congo region

Thomas James Comber (7 November 1852 – 27 June 1887) was a Baptist missionary from England who was active in the Congo region before the Congo Free State was established.

== Early years ==
Thomas James Comber was born on 7 November 1852 in Claredon Street, Camberwell, London. His father was a manufacturing jeweler. Both parents were members of the Denmark Place Baptist Chapel. He was the second of five children, one of whom died in infancy. He was trained at Regent's Park College, London.

== Missionary career ==
=== Cameroons ===
The Baptist Missionary Society (BMS) accepted Comber for service in the Cameroons. He served there with George Grenfell from 1876 to 1878. In 1878 Comber and Grenville made two exploratory trips to the Congo River to check the viability of a mission there. Grenfell resigned from the BMS, but Comber was able to get support for a mission to the Congo when he returned to Britain. On 4 April 1879 he married Minnie Rickards, daughter of his Sunday school teacher.

=== Early days in the Congo ===
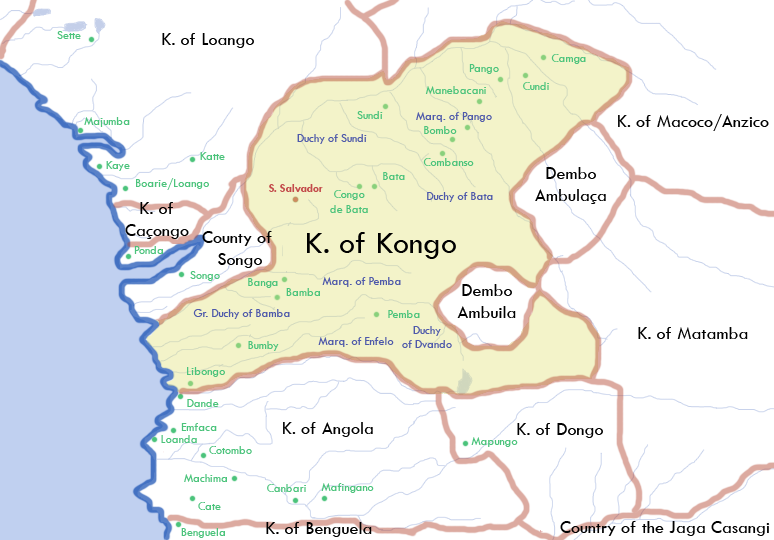
Kingdom of Kongo

The first group of Baptist missionaries sailed from Liverpool for the Congo later in April 1879, and reached Banana on 9 June 1879 after a voyage of six weeks and two days. From there they went up to Msuka in the Zaire, and then divided into two parties and went by land to São Salvador, capital of the Kingdom of Kongo. Soon after their arrival, on 24 August Comber's wife, who was recovering from a serious bout of fever, died of meningitis. At first the missionaries lived in straw huts, but by the next spring they had completed a stone house. Comber and H. E. Crudgington left on 2 January 1880 hoping to reach Stanley Pool. They received a friendly reception almost everywhere, particularly in Mwala, where they stayed for a week. However, none of their attempts for 18 months managed to reach the Pool. During one of these trips Crudgington received an iron projectile in his back that penetrated to a depth of 4 centimetres (1.6 in), and had to return to San Salvador to have it removed.

=== Later events ===
In 1884 Minnie Comber's sister, who was a missionary in the Cameroons, died. In 1885 his brother, also a missionary in the Congo, also died. Comber's Congolese servant William Mantu Parkinson was baptized in 1886 in São Salvador, the first convert. In June 1887 Comber contracted a remittent fever complicated with hematuria, and was told by the doctor that a sea voyage was the only hope for saving his life. Lieutenant Louis Valcke, President of the Executive Board of the Congo Free State, let the mission take the Prince Baudouin ship from Underhill to Banana, and there they carried Comber onto the homeward bound German steamer Lulu Bohlen. The sea breezes only had a temporary beneficial effect, and on 27 June 1887 Comber died while the vessel was anchored off Loango.

== Publications ==
- T. J Comber (1880), Brief account of recent journeys in the interior of Congo
- T. J Comber (1884), A boat journey round Stanley Pool
- T. J Comber (1884), Notes on African fevers and dysentery
- T. J Comber (1885), Explorations by the Revs. George Grenfell and T.J. Comber on the Congo, from Stanley Pool to Bangala, and up the Bochini to the Junction of the Kwango
- T. J Comber, Manual for missionaries to the Congo : outfitting, constitution of mission, travelling, etc.

== Sources ==
- Myers, John Brown (1888), Thomas J. Comber: Missionary Pioneer to the Congo, S.W. Partridge
- Stanley, Brian (1998), Gerald H. Anderson (ed.), "Comber, Thomas James", Biographical Dictionary of Christian Missions, W. B. Eerdmans Publishing Company
- Stonelake, Alfred R.; Coxill, H. Wakelin (10 November 1948), "CRUDGINGTON (H. E.)" (PDF), Biographie Coloniale Belge (in French), vol. II, Inst. roy. colon. belge, pp. col. 210–212
