= Eduard Pechuël-Loesche =

German naturalist and painter (1840–1913)

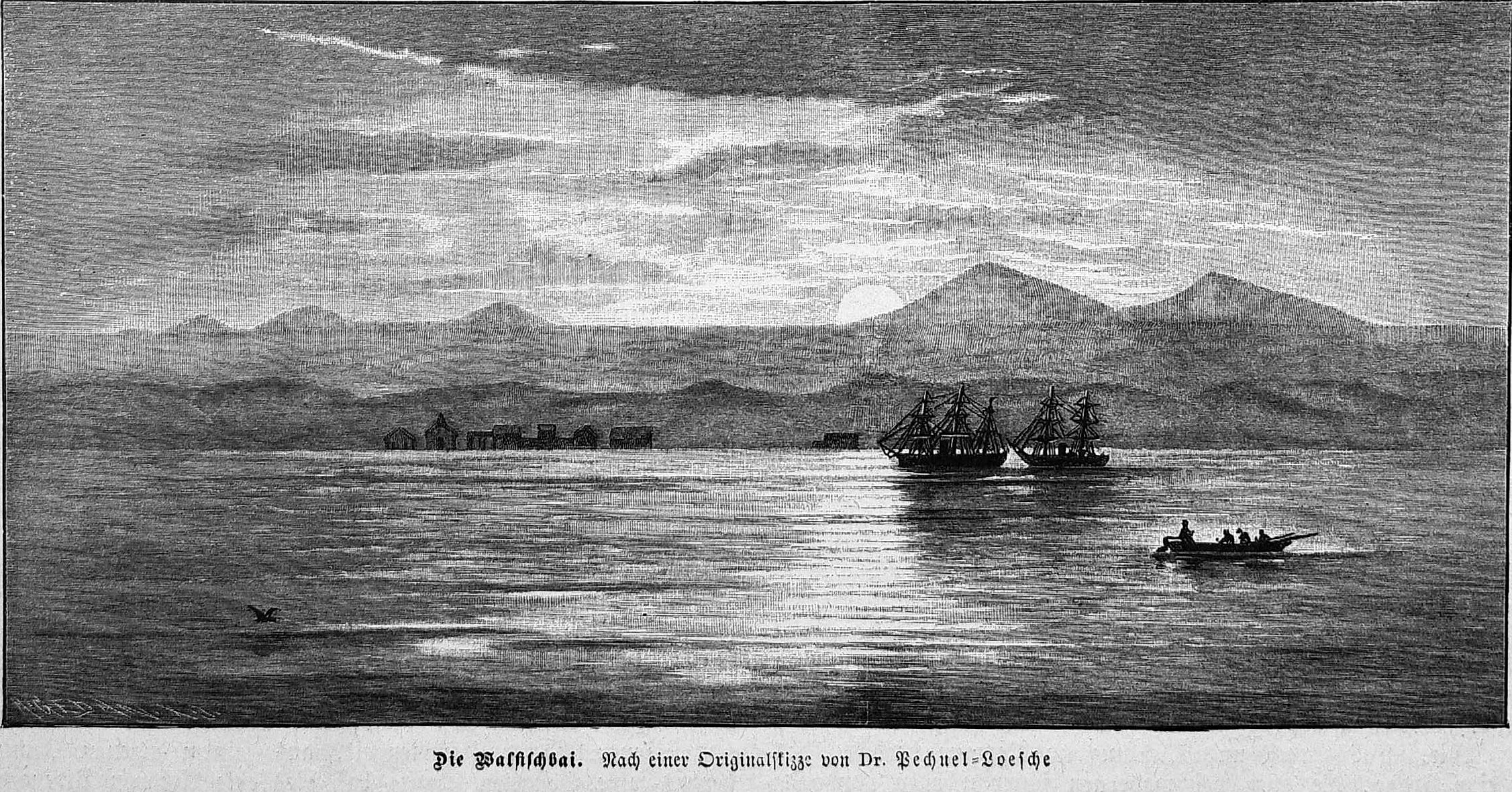
Walvis Bay after a sketch by Pechuël-Loesche

Moritz Eduard Pechuël-Loesche, (26 July 1840, Zöschen – 29 May 1913, Munich), was a German naturalist, geographer, ethnologist, painter, traveler, author, plant collector and professor of geography in Jena and Erlangen. Eduard was the eldest son of Ferdinand Moritz Pechuël, an innkeeper and mill owner, and Wilhelmine Lösche.

After school he joined the merchant navy and travelled widely during the 1860s including the Azores, Cape Verde Islands, the West Indies, the Americas and the seaboards and islands of the Atlantic and Pacific oceans. He also visited the northern and southern polar regions and the Bering Strait.

Thereafter he enrolled at Leipzig University, studying natural history and geography, and gaining a Ph.D. in 1872. He accompanied Paul Güssfeldt on the Loango Expedition of 1873–76, playing a role in the founding of the Congo state and later writing a two-volume account of the expedition in 1882 and 1907, Die Loango-Expedition, ausgesandt von der Deutschen Gesellschaft zur Erforschung Aequatorial-Afrikas 1873–1876. Between 1884–85 he acted as Henry Morton Stanley's agent.

Following a further period of study at Leipzig University, he was commissioned by Leopold II to make a second trip to the Congo in 1882, whereafter he was employed by a Rhenish company and despatched to Hereroland via the Cape in 1884–85. Elsbeth von Leubnitz, his young wife whom he had married on 27 October 1881, travelled with him and they made a joint collection of plants. Their botanising was interrupted by a trip to Okahandja where they tried unsuccessfully to obtain a concession from the chief Kamaherero. On Pechuël-Loesche's return to Europe he accepted an appointment as lecturer at Leipzig University in 1886, and professor of geography at Erlangen University in 1895.

During his travels he painted some 400 aquarelles, currently housed with the Geography Department of the University of Hamburg.

He is commemorated in the Asteraceae genus Pechuel-loeschea O.Hoffm., Adenia pechuelii of the Passifloraceae and Aerva pechuelii of the Amaranthaceae, having to make way for the older Calicorema capitata. Pechuel-loeschea leubnitziae was named after Elsbeth, and is quite possibly a unique case of genus and species honouring a husband and wife respectively.
