= William Holman Bentley =

English missionary

William Holman Bentley (1855-1905) was an English missionary, Baptist Missionary Society missionary in the Congo.

== Works ==
- Dictionary and grammar of the Kongo language as spoken at San Salvador, the ancient capital of the old Kongo Empire, Central Africa, London: Baptist Missionary Society, 1886
- Life on the Congo, London: Religious Tract Society, 1887
- Ekangu Diampa dia Mfumu eto Jizu Kristu wa Mvuluzi eto. Disekwelo muna kingrekia yamu kisi kongo, London: British and Foreign Bible Society, 1893
- Pioneering on the Congo, London: The Religious Tract Society, 1900.
