= Colonization of the Congo Basin =

European colonization of Africa's Congo Basin

Colonization of the Congo Basin refers to the European colonization of the Congo Basin of tropical Africa. It was the last part of the continent to be colonized. By the end of the 19th century, the Basin had been carved up by European colonial powers into the Congo Free State, the French Congo and the Portuguese Congo (modern Cabinda Province of Angola).

== Early European exploration ==
Map of explorations in the Congo (in the course of the 19th century)

One by one the other great mysteries had been explored:

- The coasts by Prince Henry the Navigator's Portuguese sailors in the 15th century.
- The Blue Nile by James Bruce in 1773.
- The remote upper Niger by Mungo Park in 1796.
- The vast Sahara by competitors Laing, Caillié, and Clapperton in the 1820s.
- The fever-ridden mangroves of the lower Niger by the brothers Richard and John Lander in 1830.
- Southern Africa and the Zambezi by Livingstone and John Clafton in the 1850s.
- The upper Nile by Burton, Speke, and Baker in a succession of expeditions between 1857 and 1868.

Though the Congo had been one of the first to be attempted, it remained a mystery.

Since the 15th century, European explorers had sailed into the broad Congo estuary, planning to fight their way up the falls and rapids that begin only 100 miles (160 km) inland, and then travel up the river to its unknown source. All failed. The rapids and falls, had they known it, extended for 220 miles (350 km) inland, and the terrain close by the river was impassable, and remains so to this day.

Repeated attempts to travel overland were repulsed with heavy casualties, accidents, conflicts with natives, and, above all, disease saw large and well-equipped expeditions got no further than 40 miles (64 km) or so past the westernmost rapid, the legendary Cauldron of Hell.

== Stanley's exploration ==
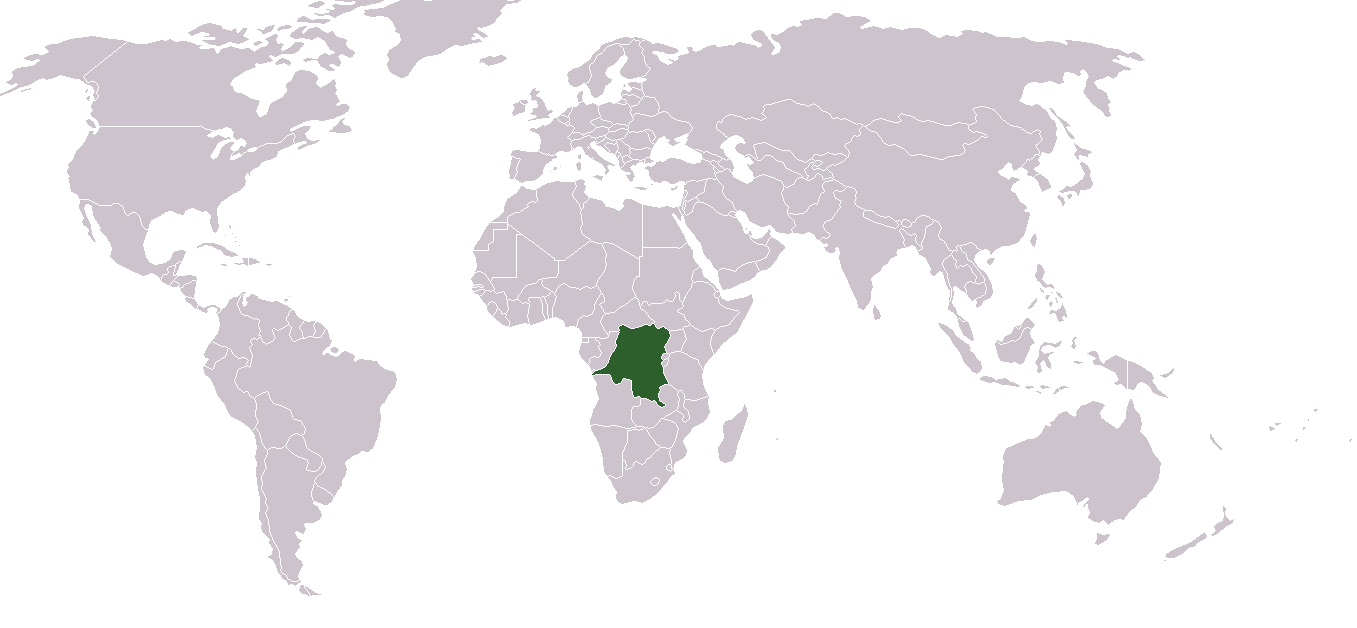
The Congo Free State

It was not until 1877 that the Congo was explored by Europeans, and even then it was not from the sea, but from the other side of the African continent. Setting out from Zanzibar, Henry Morton Stanley, a British-born American journalist and explorer aimed to find the famous Dr. Livingstone. Livingstone had not been heard from in several years and was, in fact, exploring the upper reaches of a great navigable inland river called the Lualaba, which Livingstone hoped was connected to the Nile, but which turned out to be the upper Congo.

After leaving Livingstone, Stanley sailed for 1,000 miles (1,600 km) down the Lualaba (Upper Congo) to the large lake he named Stanley Pool (now called Pool Malebo). Then, rather than perish in the impenetrable country of the cascades, Stanley took a wide detour overland to come within striking distance of the European trading station at Boma on the Congo estuary.

== Prelude to conquest ==
=== Henry Morton Stanley ===
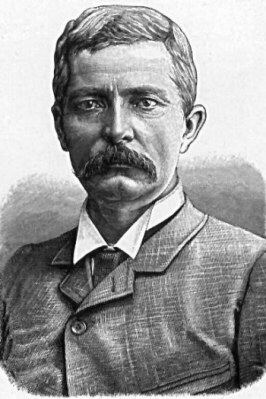
Henry Morton Stanley, above, found Dr. Livingstone in Africa and brought tales back to Europe

When Stanley returned to Europe in 1878, he had not only found Dr. Livingstone (an event remembered to this day), resolved the last great mystery of African exploration, and ruined his health: he had also opened the heart of tropical Africa up to the outside world. This was to be his most enduring legacy.

Stanley was lionised across Europe. He wrote articles, appeared at public meetings, lobbied the rich and powerful tirelessly; and always his theme was the boundless opportunity for commercial exploitation of the lands he had discovered or, in his own words, to "pour the civilisation of Europe into the barbarism of Africa".

"There are 40,000,000 naked people" on the other side of the rapids, Stanley wrote, "and the cotton-spinners of Manchester are waiting to clothe them... Birmingham's factories are glowing with the red metal that shall presently be made into ironwork in every fashion and shape for them... and the ministers of Christ are zealous to bring them, the poor benighted heathen, into the Christian fold."

Europe was less than keen on the idea: the great European scramble for Africa had not yet begun. Outside of the Cape of Good Hope and the Mediterranean coast, Europe had no African colonies of any significance. The focus of the great powers was still firmly on the lands that had made Europe's fortune: the Americas, the East Indies, India, China, and Australasia. There seemed no economic sense to investing energy in Africa when the returns from other colonies were likely to be both richer and more immediate. Nor was there a strong humanitarian interest in the continent now that the American slave trade had been extinguished. Stanley was applauded, admired, decorated—and ignored.

=== King Leopold II of Belgium ===
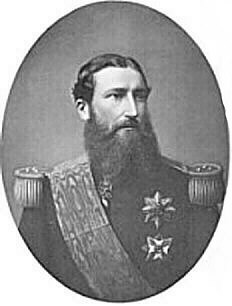
King Leopold II's determination to conquer a piece of Africa sent Stanley back to establish the Congo Free State

It is at this point that Leopold II of Belgium took a part. In Peter Forbath's words, Leopold was:

A tall, imposing man ... enjoying a reputation for hedonistic sensuality, cunning intelligence (his father once described him as subtle and sly as a fox), overweening ambition, and personal ruthlessness. He was, nevertheless, an extremely minor monarch in the realpolitik of the times, ruling a totally insignificant nation, a nation in fact that had come into existence barely four decades before and lived under the constant threat of losing its precarious independence to the great European powers around it. He was a figure who, one might have had every reason to expect, would devote himself to maintaining his country's strict neutrality, avoiding giving offence to any of his powerful neighbours, and indulging his keenly developed tastes for the pleasures of the flesh, rather than one who would make a profound impact on history. Yet, in the most astonishing and improbable way imaginable, he managed virtually single-handedly to upset the balance of power in Africa and usher in the terrible age of European colonialism on the black continent.

As a constitutional monarch, Leopold was charged with the usual constitutional duties of opening parliaments, greeting diplomats, and attending state funerals. He had no power to decide policy. But for over 20 years he had been agitating for Belgium to take its place among the great colonial powers of Europe. Leopold noted, "Our frontiers can never be extended into Europe." However, he added, "since history teaches that colonies are useful, that they play a great part in that which makes up the power and prosperity of states, let us strive to get one in our turn."

At various times, he launched unsuccessful schemes to buy an Argentine province, to buy Borneo from the Dutch, rent the Philippines from Spain, or establish colonies in China, Vietnam, Japan, or the Pacific islands. When the 1860s explorers focused attention on Africa, Leopold schemed to colonise Mozambique on the east coast, Senegal on the west coast, and the Congo in the centre. None of these schemes came anywhere near fruition: the government of Belgium resolutely resisted all Leopold's suggestions, seeing the acquisition of a colony as a good way to spend large amounts of money for little or no return.

Leopold's eventual response was extraordinary in its hubris and simplicity. If the government of Belgium would not take a colony, then he would simply do it himself, acting in his private capacity as an ordinary citizen.

=== Brussels Geographic Conference ===
In 1876, Leopold II sponsored an international geographical conference in Brussels, inviting delegates from scientific societies all over Europe to discuss philanthropic and scientific matters such as the best way to coordinate map making, to prevent the re-emergence of the west coast slave trade, and to investigate ways of sending medical aid to Africa. The conference was a sham: at its close, Leopold proposed that they set up an international benevolent committee to carry on, and modestly agreed to accept the chairman's role. He created a baffling series of subsidiary shell organisations, culminating in the cunningly named International African Association (French: Association internationale africaine), which had a single shareholder: Leopold himself. For the look of things, he held one more meeting the following year, but from that time on, the International African Association was simply a front for Leopold's ambition.

=== Stanley as Leopold's agent ===
Soon after Stanley returned from the Congo, Leopold tried to recruit him. Stanley, still hopeful for British backing, brushed him off. However, Leopold persisted and eventually Stanley gave in. Leopold II, it seemed, was the only European willing to finance Stanley's dream: the building of a railway over the Crystal Mountains from the sea to Stanley Pool, from which river steamers could reach 1,000 miles (1,600 km) into the heart of Africa.

Stanley, much more familiar with the rigours of the African climate and the complexities of local politics than Leopold — Leopold II never set foot in the Congo — persuaded his patron that the first step should be the construction of a wagon trail and a series of forts. Leopold agreed and in deepest secrecy, Stanley signed a five-year contract at a salary of £1,000 a year, and set off to Zanzibar under an assumed name. To avoid discovery, materials and workers were shipped in by various roundabout routes, and communications between Stanley and Leopold were entrusted to Colonel Maximilien Strauch.

It was only at this point that Stanley was informed of the magnitude of Leopold's ambition: Stanley was not merely to construct a series of trading stations, he was to secretly carve out an entire nation. The instructions were direct and to the point: "It is a question of creating a new State, as big as possible, and of running it. It is clearly understood that in this project there is no question of granting the slightest political power to the negros. That would be absurd."

Apparently finding nothing reprehensible about Leopold's ambitions, Stanley set about his task with a will. For all his social shortcomings in European society, he was undoubtedly the right man for the job. Within three years, his capacity for hard work, his skill at playing one social group off against another, his ruthless use of modern weaponry to kill opponents, and above all his relentless determination opened the route to the Upper Congo.

In later years, Stanley would write that the most vexing part of his duties was not the work itself, nor negotiating with the natives, but keeping order amongst the ill-assorted collection of white men he had brought with him as overseers, who squabbled constantly over small matters of rank or status. "Almost all of them", he wrote, "clamoured for expenses of all kinds, which included ... wine, tobacco, cigars, clothes, shoes, board and lodging, and certain nameless extravagances" (by which he meant attractive slaves to warm their beds).

Exhausted, Stanley returned to Europe, only to be sent straight back by Leopold, who promised him an outstanding assistant: Charles 'Chinese' Gordon (who did not in fact take up Leopold's offer but chose instead to go to meet his fate at Khartoum). "It is indispensable", instructed Leopold, "that you should purchase for the Comité d'Études (i.e., Leopold himself) as much land as you can obtain".

Having established a beachhead on the lower Congo, in 1883 Stanley set out upriver to extend Leopold's domain, employing his usual methods: negotiations with local chiefs buying sovereignty in exchange for bolts of cloth and trinkets; playing one tribe off another; and if need be, simply shooting an obstructive chief and negotiating with his cowed successor instead. However, as he approached Stanley Falls at the junction between the Congo proper and the Lualaba (close to the general vicinity of Central Africa where he had found Livingstone six years before), it soon became clear that Stanley's men were not the only intruders.

=== Dealings with Zanzibari slave traders ===
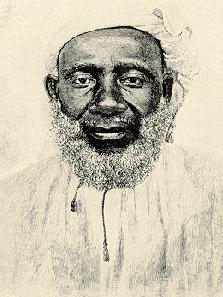
Zanzibari slave trader Tippu Tip had raided villages to enslave their people before Stanley's arrival

Tippu Tip, the most powerful of the Zanzibari slave traders of the 19th century, was well known to Stanley, as was the social chaos and devastation that slave-hunting brought. It had only been through Tippu Tip's help that Stanley had found Livingstone (who himself had survived years on the Lualaba by virtue of Tippu Tip's friendship). Now, Stanley discovered, Tippu Tip's men had reached still further west in search of fresh populations to enslave.

Four years before, the Zanzibaris had thought the Congo deadly and impassable, and warned Stanley not to attempt to go there, but when Tippu Tip learned in Zanzibar that Stanley had survived, he was quick to act. Villages throughout the region had been burned and depopulated. Tippu Tip had raided 118 villages, killed 4,000 Africans, and, when Stanley reached his camp, had 2,300 slaves, mostly young women and children, in chains ready to transport halfway across the continent to the markets of Zanzibar.

Having found the new ruler of the upper Congo, Stanley negotiated an agreement with Tippu Tip to allow him to build his final river station just below Stanley Falls (which prevented vessels sailing further upstream). At the end of his physical resources, Stanley returned home, to be replaced by Lieutenant Colonel Francis de Winton, formerly a British Army officer.

== See also ==
- Belgian Congo
- French Congo
- Portuguese Congo
- Scramble for Africa
- Congo Reform Association
- Congo Free State
- Congo river steamers
