= Henry Morton Stanley =

Welsh journalist and explorer (1841–1904)

Sir Henry Morton Stanley GCB
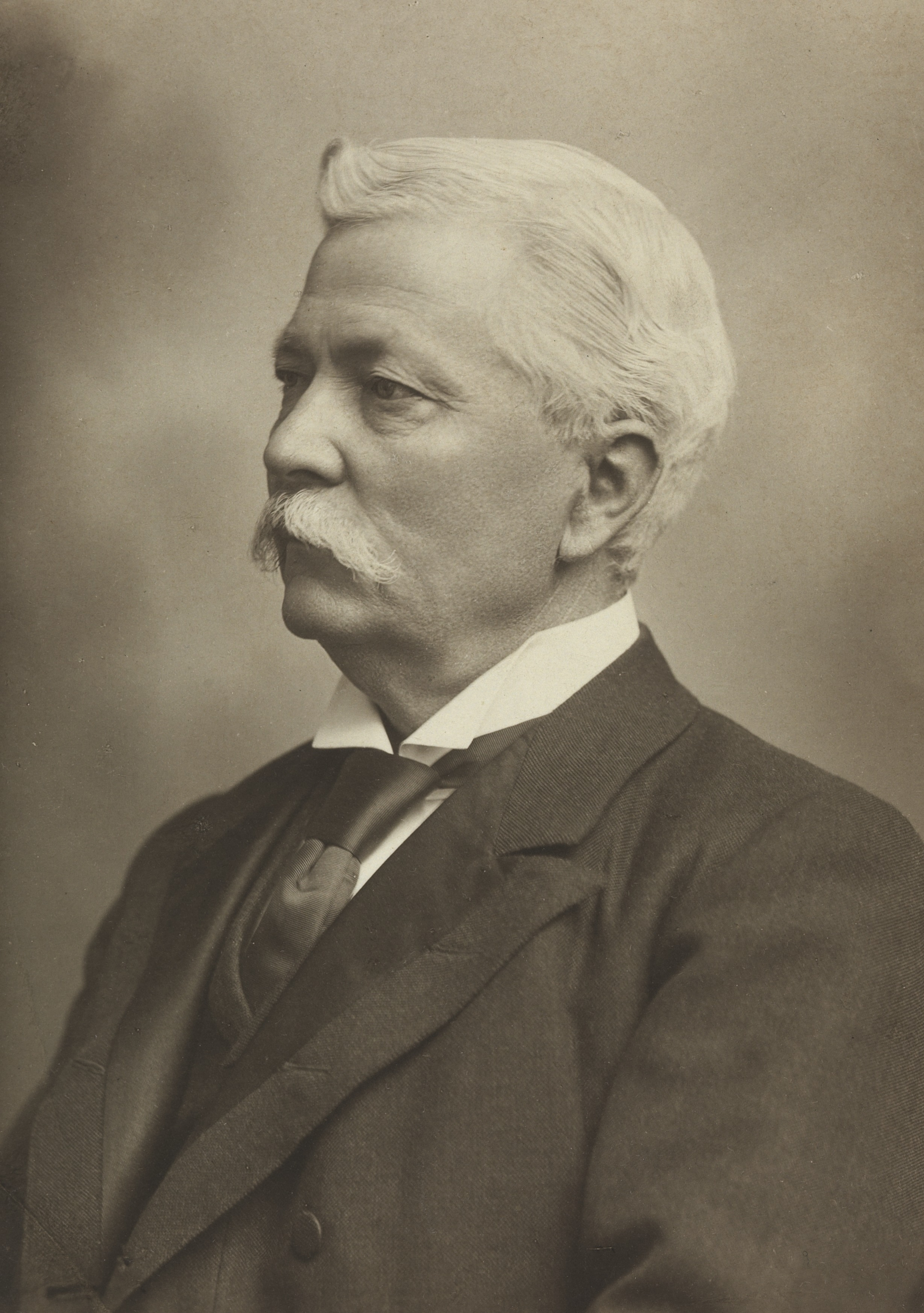
- Born: John Rowlands; 28 January 1841; Denbigh, Wales
- Died: 10 May 1904 (aged 63); Westminster, London, England
- Burial place: Pirbright, Surrey, England
- Citizenship: United Kingdom; United States (from 1885)
- Political party: Liberal Unionist
- Spouse: Dorothy Tennant (m. 1890)
- Awards: Vega Medal (1883)

Member of Parliament for Lambeth North
- In office 15 July 1895 – 17 September 1900
- Preceded by: Francis Coldwells
- Succeeded by: Frederick William Horner
- Military service
- Allegiance: Confederate States (1861–1862); United States (1862–1865)
- Branch: Confederate Army (1861–1862); Union Army (1862); Union Navy (1864–1865)
- Service years: 1861–1862; 1864–1865
- Rank: Private; Ship's clerk
- Units: 6th Arkansas Infantry Regiment; USS Minnesota
- Conflicts: American Civil War; (With the CS); Battle of Shiloh (POW); (With the US); First Battle of Fort Fisher; Second Battle of Fort Fisher

Signature
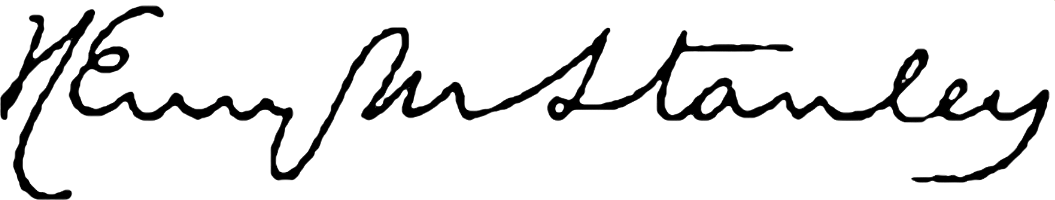

Sir Henry Morton Stanley (born John Rowlands; 28 January 1841 – 10 May 1904) was a Welsh-American (Note: Stanley was Welsh by birth and upbringing, but assumed an American identity as a young man and consistently represented himself as an American throughout his life. He was naturalised as an American citizen in 1885, though he later resumed his British subjecthood in 1892 to run for Parliament.) explorer, journalist, soldier, colonial administrator, author, and politician famous for his exploration of Central Africa and search for missionary and explorer David Livingstone. Besides his discovery of Livingstone, he is mainly known for his search for the sources of the Nile and Congo rivers, the work he undertook as an agent of King Leopold II of the Belgians that enabled the occupation of the Congo Basin region, and his command of the Emin Pasha Relief Expedition. He was knighted in 1897, and served in Parliament as a Liberal Unionist member for Lambeth North from 1895 to 1900.

More than a century after his death, Stanley's legacy remains the subject of enduring controversy. Although he personally had high regard for many of the native African people who accompanied him on his expeditions, the exaggerated accounts of corporal punishment and brutality in his books fostered a public reputation as a hard-driving, cruel leader, in contrast to the supposedly more humanitarian Livingstone. His contemporary image in Britain suffered from the perception that he was American. In the 20th century, his reputation was also seriously damaged by his role in establishing the Congo Free State for King Leopold II. Nevertheless, he is recognised for his important contributions to Western knowledge of the geography of Central Africa and for his resolute opposition to the slave trade in East Africa.

== Early life ==
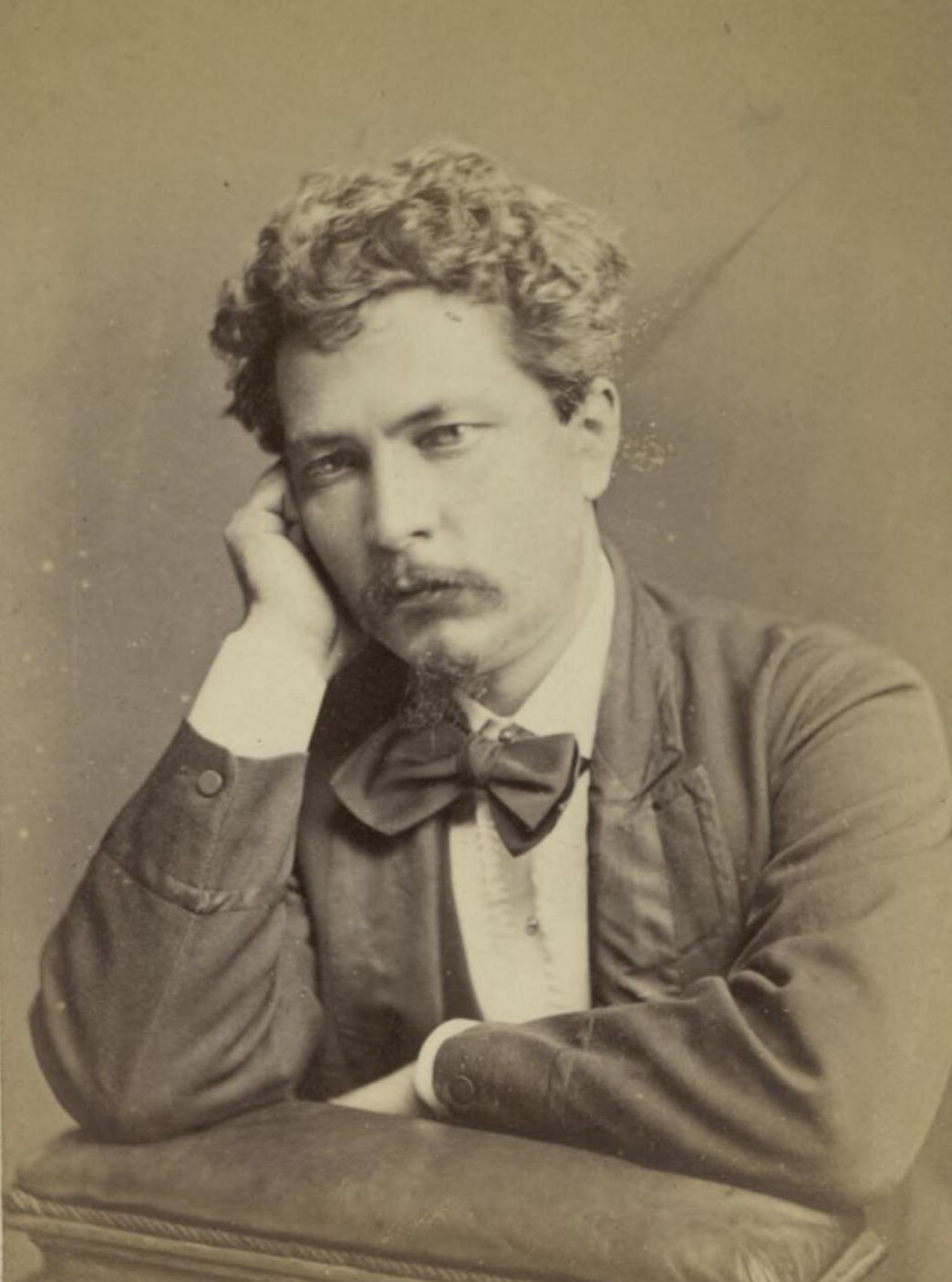
Portrait of a young Henry Morton Stanley c. 1870s

Henry Stanley was born as John Rowlands in Denbigh, Denbighshire, Wales. His mother Elizabeth Parry was 18 years old at the time of his birth. She abandoned him as a very young baby and cut off all communication. Stanley never knew his father, who died within a few weeks of his birth. There is some doubt as to his true parentage. As his parents were unmarried, his birth certificate describes him as a bastard; he was baptised in the parish of Denbigh on 19 February 1841, the register recording that he had been born on 28 January of that year. The entry states that he was the bastard son of John Rowland of Llys Llanrhaidr and Elizabeth Parry of Castle. The stigma associated with illegitimacy weighed heavily upon him all his life.

The boy was given his father's surname of Rowlands and brought up by his grandfather Moses Parry, a once-prosperous butcher who was living in reduced circumstances. He died when John was five. Rowlands then stayed with families of cousins and nieces for a short time, but he was eventually sent to the St Asaph Union Workhouse for the Poor. The overcrowding and lack of supervision resulted in his being frequently abused by older boys. Historian Robert Aldrich has alleged that the headmaster of the workhouse raped or sexually assaulted Rowlands, and that the older Rowlands was "incontrovertibly bisexual". When Rowlands was 10 years old, his mother and two half-siblings stayed for a short while in this workhouse, but he did not recognise them until the headmaster told him who they were.

== Life in the United States ==
Rowlands emigrated to the United States in 1859 at age 18. He disembarked at New Orleans and, according to his own declarations, became friends by accident with Henry Hope Stanley, a wealthy trader. He saw Stanley sitting on a chair outside his store and asked him if he had any job openings. He did so in the British style: "Do you need a boy, sir?" The childless man had indeed been wishing he had a son, and the inquiry led to a job and a close relationship between them. Out of admiration, John took Stanley's name. Later, he wrote that his adoptive parent died two years after their meeting, but in fact the elder Stanley did not die until 1878. This and other discrepancies led John Bierman to argue that no adoption took place. Tim Jeal goes further, and, in his biography, subjects Stanley's account in his posthumously published Autobiography to detailed analysis. Because Stanley got so many basic facts wrong about his purported adoptive family, Jeal concludes that it is very unlikely that he ever met rich Henry Hope Stanley, and that an ordinary grocer, James Speake, was Rowlands' true benefactor until his (Speake's) sudden death in October 1859.

Stanley reluctantly joined in the American Civil War, first enrolling in the Confederate States Army's 6th Arkansas Infantry Regiment and fighting in the Battle of Shiloh in 1862. After being taken prisoner there, he was recruited at Camp Douglas, Illinois, by its commander Colonel James A. Mulligan as a "Galvanized Yankee." He joined the Union Army on 4 June 1862 but was discharged 18 days later because of severe illness. After recovering, he served on several merchant ships before joining the US Navy in July 1864. He became a record keeper on board the USS Minnesota, and participated in the First Battle of Fort Fisher and the Second Battle of Fort Fisher, which led him into freelance journalism. Stanley and a junior colleague jumped ship on 10 February 1865 in Portsmouth, New Hampshire, in search of greater adventures. Stanley was possibly the only man to serve in the Confederate Army, the Union Army, and the Union Navy.

== British expedition to Abyssinia (1867–1868) ==
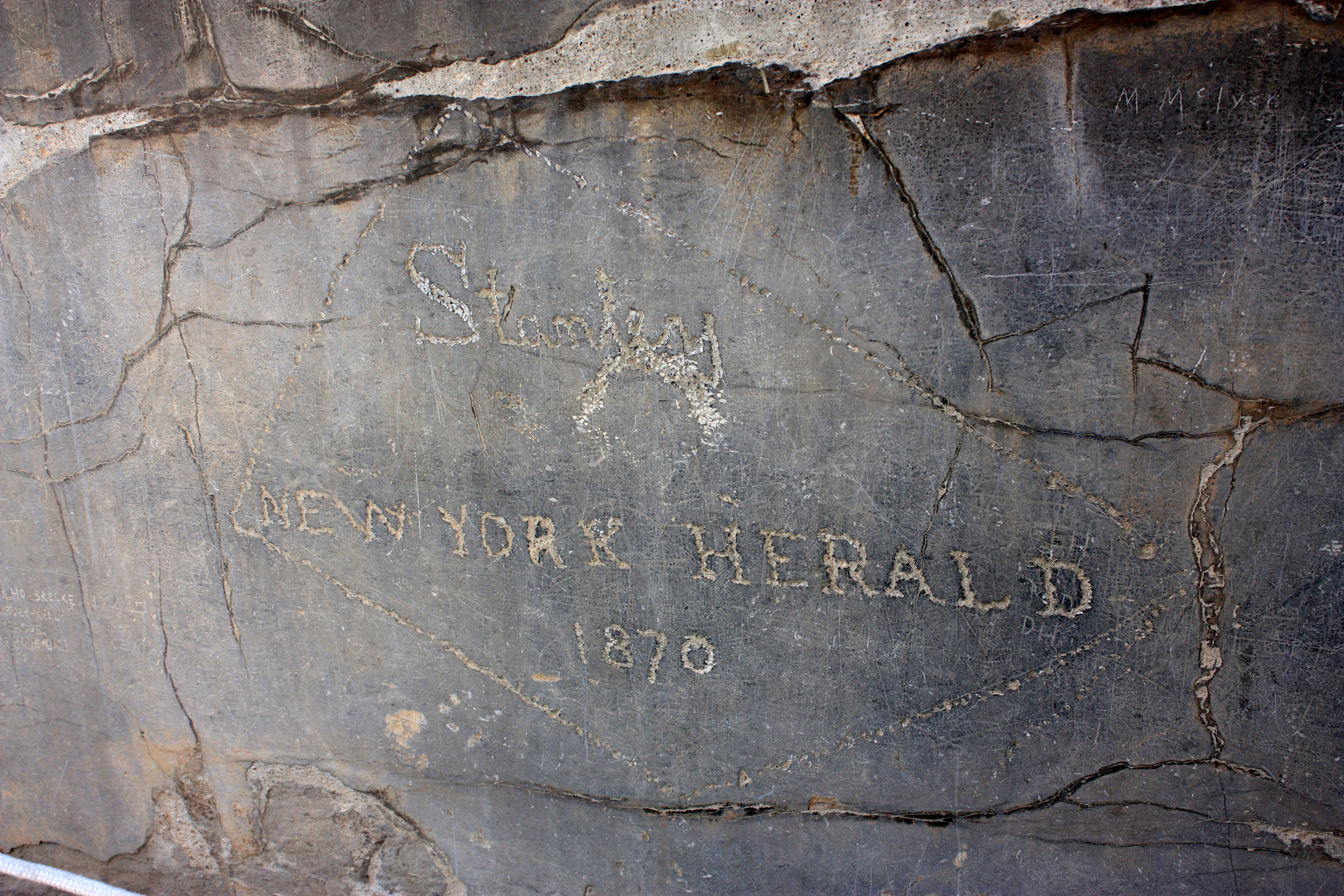
Stanley's graffito at Persepolis, Iran

Following the American Civil War, Stanley became a journalist in the days of frontier expansion in the American West. He then organised an expedition to the Ottoman Empire that ended catastrophically when he was imprisoned. He eventually talked his way out of jail and received restitution for damaged expedition equipment.

In 1867, the emperor of Ethiopia, Tewodros II, held a British envoy and others hostage, and a force was sent to effect the release of the hostages. Stanley accompanied that force as a special correspondent of the New York Herald. His report on the Battle of Magdala in 1868 was the first to be published, as he had bribed a telegraph operator to send his story first, even before the official army report. After his message was sent, the cable broke; British government officials were greatly irritated to learn of the battle from an American newspaper. Subsequently, he was assigned to report on Spain's Glorious Revolution in 1868. In 1870, Stanley undertook several assignments for the Herald in the Middle East and the Black Sea region, visiting Egypt, Jerusalem, Constantinople, the Crimea, the Caucasus, Persia and India, during which time he apparently carved his name into a stone of the ancient palace at Persepolis in Persia.

== Finding David Livingstone expedition (1871–1872) ==
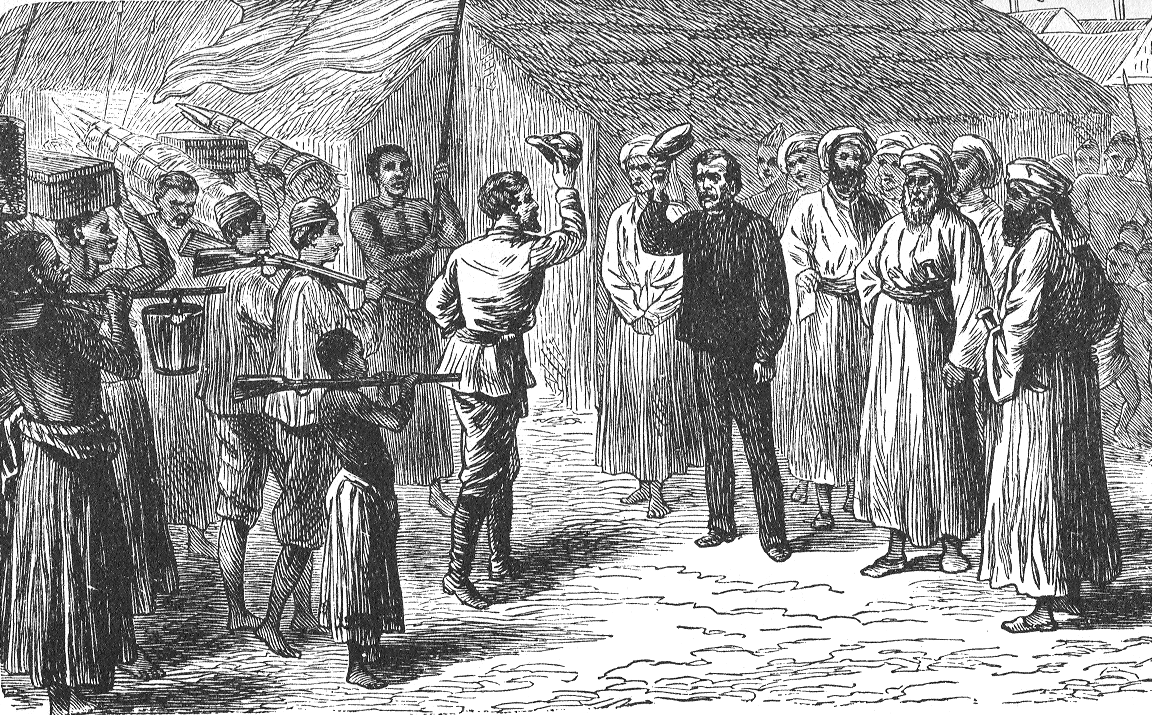
"Dr. Livingstone, I presume?", an illustration from Stanley's 1872 book How I Found Livingstone

Stanley travelled to Zanzibar in March 1871, later claiming that he outfitted an expedition with 192 porters. In his first dispatch to the New York Herald, however, he stated that his expedition numbered only 111. This was in line with figures in his diaries. James Gordon Bennett Jr., publisher of the New York Herald and funder of the expedition, had delayed sending to Stanley the money he had promised, so Stanley borrowed money from the United States Consul.

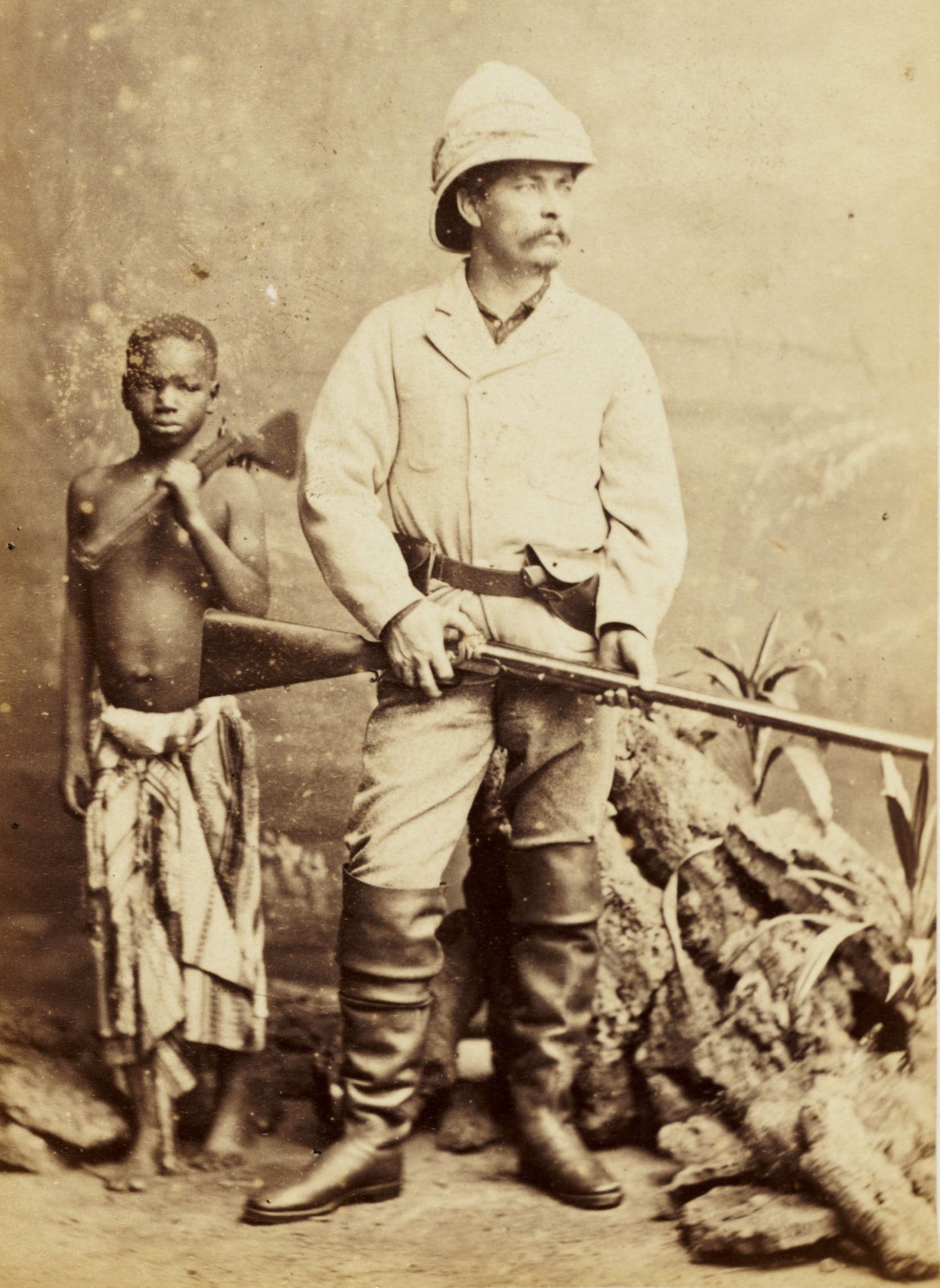
1872 Carte de visite – Stanley and Kalulu

During the 700-mile (1,100 km) expedition through the tropical forest, his thoroughbred stallion died within a few days after a bite from a tsetse fly, many of his porters deserted, and the rest were decimated by tropical diseases. Stanley found David Livingstone on 10 November 1871 in Ujiji, near Lake Tanganyika in present-day Tanzania. He later claimed to have greeted him with the now-famous line, "Dr. Livingstone, I presume?" This line does not appear in his journal from the time—the two pages directly following the recording of his initial spotting of Livingstone were torn out of the journal at some point—and it is likely that Stanley simply invented the pithy line sometime afterwards. Neither man mentioned it in any of the letters they wrote at this time, and Livingstone tended to instead recount the reaction of his servant, Susi, who cried out: "An Englishman coming! I see him!" The phrase is first quoted in a summary of Stanley's letters published by The New York Times on 2 July 1872. Stanley biographer Tim Jeal argued that the explorer invented it afterwards to help raise his standing because of "insecurity about his background", though ironically the phrase was mocked in the press for being absurdly formal for the situation.

The Herald's own first account of the meeting, published 1 July 1872, reports:

Preserving a calmness of exterior before the Arabs which was hard to simulate as he reached the group, Mr. Stanley said: – "Doctor Livingstone, I presume?" A smile lit up the features of the pale white man as he answered: "Yes, and I feel thankful that I am here to welcome you."

Stanley joined Livingstone in exploring the region, finding that there was no waterway from Lake Tanganyika to the Nile. On his return, he wrote a book about his experiences: How I Found Livingstone; travels, adventures, and discoveries in Central Africa (1872).

== First trans-Africa expedition (1874–1877) ==
In 1874, the New York Herald and the Daily Telegraph financed Stanley on another expedition to Africa. His ambitious objective was to complete the exploration and mapping of the Central African Great Lakes and rivers, in the process circumnavigating Lakes Victoria and Tanganyika and locating the source of the Nile. Between 1875 and 1876 Stanley succeeded in the first part of his objective, establishing that Lake Victoria had only a single outlet, the one discovered by John Hanning Speke on 21 July 1862 and named Ripon Falls. If this was not the Nile's source, then the separate massive northward flowing river called by Livingstone, the Lualaba, and mapped by him in its upper reaches, might flow on north to connect with the Nile via Lake Albert and thus be the river's primary source.

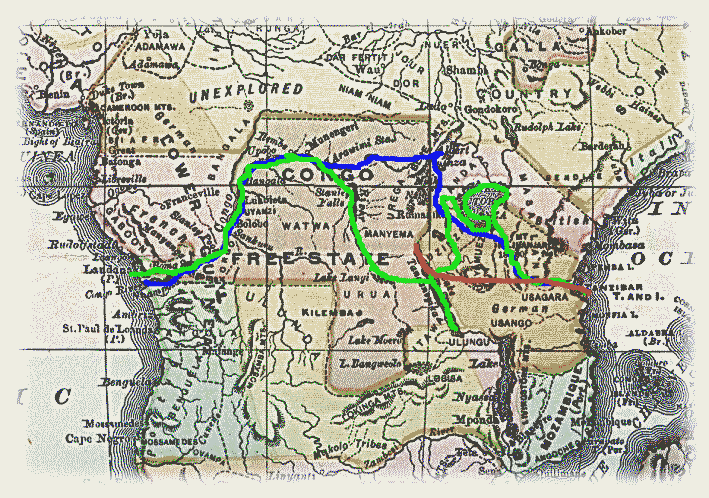
Routes of Stanley's expeditions in Central Africa

It was therefore essential that Stanley should trace the course of the Lualaba downstream (northward) from Nyangwe, the point where Livingstone had left it in July 1871. Between November 1876 and August 1877, Stanley and his men navigated the Lualaba up to and beyond the point where it turned sharply westward, away from the Nile, identifying itself as the Congo River. Having succeeded with this second objective, they then traced the river to the sea. During this expedition, Stanley used sectional boats and dug-out canoes to pass the large cataracts that separated the Congo into distinct tracts. These boats were transported around the rapids before being reassembled to travel on the next section of river. In passing the rapids many of his men were drowned, including his last white colleague, Frank Pocock. The expedition was repeatedly attacked by natives in canoes, likely by Ngobila, a lord in the Tio Kingdom. Stanley and his men reached the Portuguese outpost of Boma, around 100 kilometres (62 mi) from the mouth of the Congo River on the Atlantic Ocean, after 999 days on 9 August 1877. Muster lists and Stanley's diary (12 November 1874) show that he started with 228 people and reached Boma with 114 survivors, with him the only European left alive out of four. In Stanley's Through the Dark Continent (1878) (in which he coined the term "Dark Continent" for Africa), Stanley said that his expedition had numbered 356, the exaggeration detracting from his achievement.

Stanley attributed his success to his leading African porters, saying that his success was "all due to the pluck and intrinsic goodness of 20 men ... take the 20 out and I could not have proceeded beyond a few days' journey". Professor James Newman has written that "establishing the connection between the Lualaba and Congo Rivers and locating the source of the Victoria Nile" justified him (Newman) in stating that: "In terms of exploration and discovery as defined in nineteenth-century Europe, he (Stanley) clearly stands at the top."

During his expedition, Stanley encountered a people known as the Gambaragara, residing in the mountainous region to the west of Lake Victoria. He had first learned of them during his mission to find Livingstone, but was unable to make encounters at the time due to security concerns. Stanley described them as possessing notably light complexions and features he associated with European peoples, leading him to characterize them as an African "white tribe" and "Greeks in white shirts." The documentation of his experience had significant consequences, and it became a key source cited by explorers and scientists in support of the Hamitic Hypothesis.

== International Upper Congo Expedition (1879–1884) ==
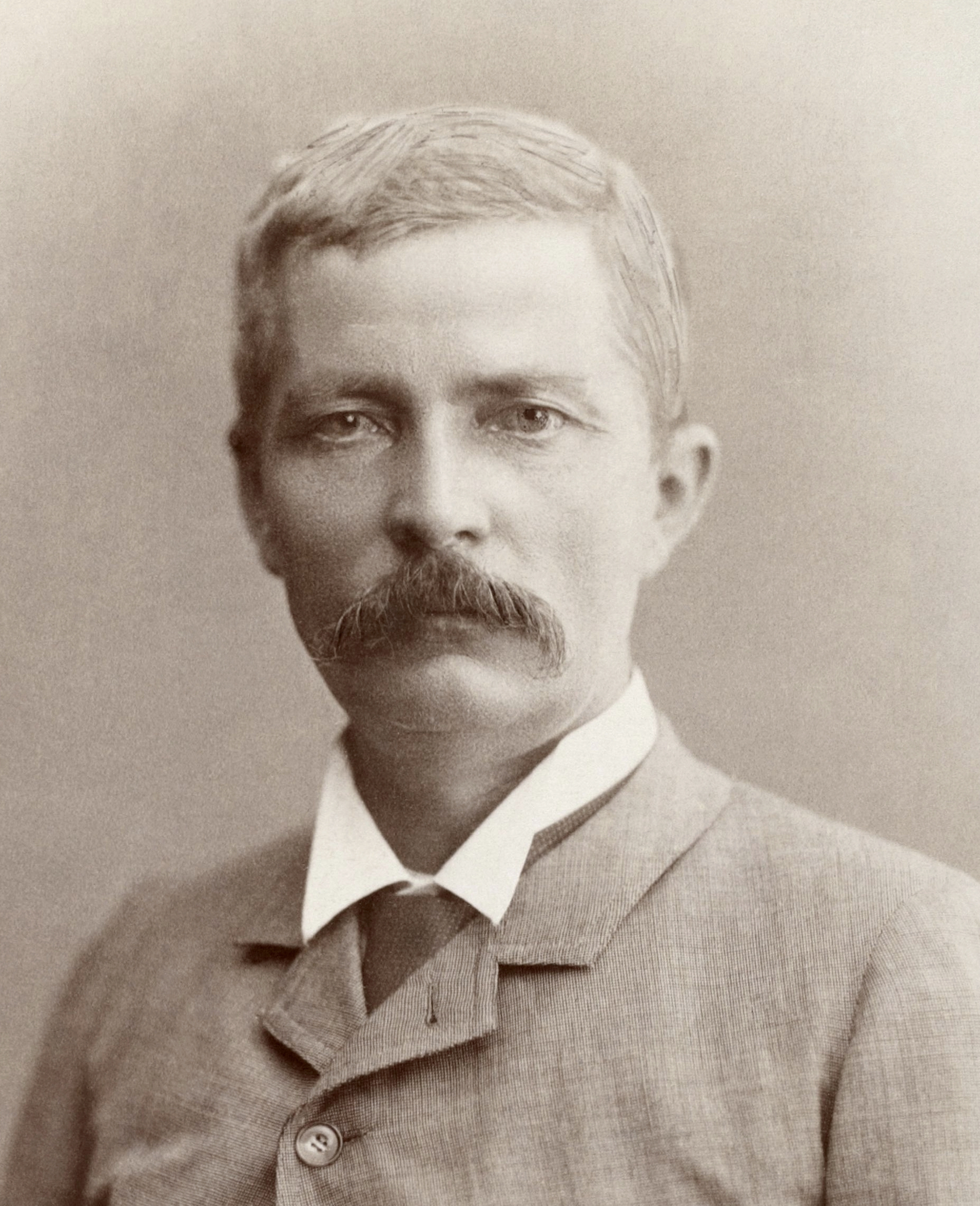
Henry M. Stanley in 1884

On 15 April 1877, King Leopold II of the Belgians sent his first expedition to Central Africa, then still under the flag of the International African Association. The members of the expedition, four Belgians, departing from Zanzibar, had the goal of establishing a scientific post in Karema, in today's Tanzania, but even before the group entered Central Africa, two of them had already died, one from a sun stroke, the other from a severe fever, upon which the other members of the expedition resigned. Because of these difficulties, Leopold realised how important it was to find experienced men to lead his expeditions. He first tried to persuade Pierre Savorgnan de Brazza, but he had already entered French service; his eye now fell on Stanley. Stanley had first hoped to continue his pioneering work in Africa under the British flag. But neither the Foreign Office nor Edward, the Prince of Wales, felt called to receive Stanley after the many rumours of his looting and killing in the interior of the African continent. Leopold eagerly received a disenchanted Stanley at his palace in June 1878, and signed a five-year contract with him in November.

Stanley persuaded Leopold that the first step should be the construction of a wagon trail around the Congo rapids and a chain of trading stations on the river. To avoid discovery, materials and workers were shipped in by various roundabout routes, and communications between Stanley and Leopold were entrusted to Colonel Maximilien Strauch.

=== Stanley as Leopold's agent ===
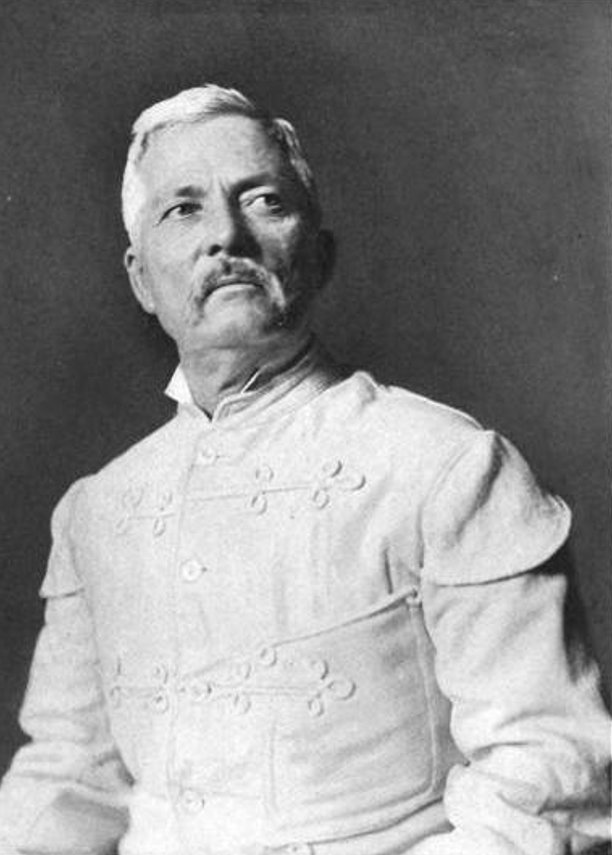
Henry Morton Stanley, 1890

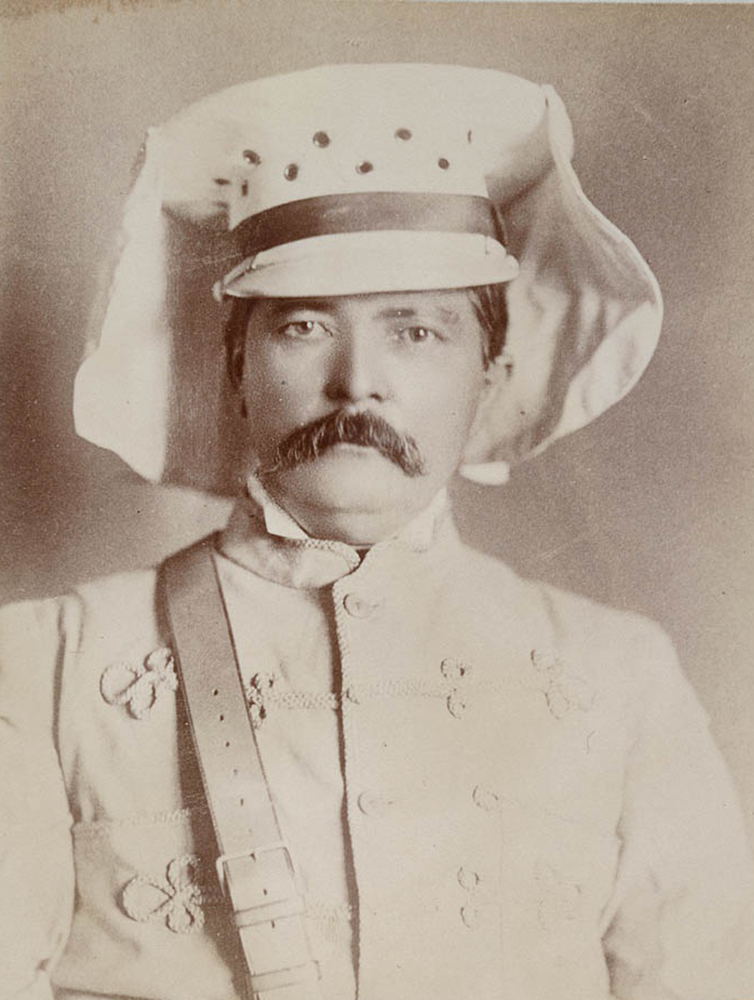
Studio Portrait of Henry Morton Stanley, ca. 1890, published by L Herbst, Sydney

In 1879, Stanley left for Africa for his first mission, ostensibly working for the Comité d'études du Haut-Congo, under Leopold's orders. King Leopold gave Stanley clear instructions: "It is not about Belgian colonies. It is about establishing a new state that is as large as possible and about its governance. It should be clear that in this project there can be no question of granting the Negroes the slightest form of political power. That would be ridiculous. The whites, who lead the posts, have all the power."

Stanley described in writings his dismay with the terrible scenes taking place in Congo. At the same time, his "findings" conveyed an idea that the Dark Continent must submit, willingly or otherwise. Stanley's writings show that he, too, held this view. "Only by proving that we are superior to the savages, not only through our power to kill them but through our entire way of life, can we control them as they are now, in their present stage; it is necessary for their own well-being, even more than ours."

Unexpectedly, France had sent its own expedition to the Congo Basin. Pierre Savorgnan de Brazza had undermined Stanley's mission by concluding contracts himself with native heads of state. The creation of a station that would later be called Brazzaville could not be prevented. Leopold was furious, writing angrily to Strauch: "The terms of the treaties Stanley has made with native chiefs do not satisfy me. There must at least be an added article to the effect that they delegate to us their sovereign rights ... the treaties must be as brief as possible and in a couple of articles must grant us everything."

Since everything in Central Africa was about the balance of power between the Great Powers, Leopold considered his next moves and sent an envoy to Berlin to press for a conference. Leopold wanted the International Association of the Congo boundaries drawn by Stanley to be officially confirmed, thus giving the Association an official status.

On 26 February 1885, the Berlin Act was signed. The Act regulated an immense free trade zone in the Congo Basin and made it a neutral territory. Furthermore, the Act declared war on slavery. The act contained only one article that Leopold disliked: Article 17 gave the superpowers the right to establish an international commission to supervise the freedom of trade and navigation in Congo. As a result, Leopold would not be able to collect customs duties on the Congo River

In 1890, on the 25th anniversary of Leopold's reign as Belgian monarch, Stanley was taken from one banquet hall to another, proclaimed a hero. Leopold honoured him with the Order of Leopold. Together they examined the entire Congolese situation. The key question was how the Free State could become profitable. Stanley pointed out to the monarch, among other things, the potential of rubber production. Stanley wrote: "You can find it on almost any tree. As we made our way through the forest, it was literally raining rubber juice. Our clothes were full of it. The Congo has so many tributaries that a well-organized company can easily extract a few tons of rubber per year here. You only have to sail up such a river and the branches with rubber hang almost up to your ship."

In 1891, rubber extraction was divided among concessionaires. This soon led to abuses, when the switch was made to "forced labour".

=== Founding of Leopoldville (Kinshasa) ===
Stanley, who had left from a post at Vivi near Matadi on 21 February 1880, arrived at Stanley pool on 3 December 1882. Building a road from Vivi to Isangila, Stanley took almost two years to traverse the rapids towing with him 50 tonnes of equipment, including two dismantled steamboats and a barge. After he arrived at Stanley pool, a local king, Makoko of the Anziku Kingdom, gave him a site near Kintambo to build a city. Despite hostilities from another nearby king, Ngaliema, he decided to start the construction of Léopoldville on the hillside of Khonzo Izulu. Today Kinshasa's population is 17,000,000, and it is one of the world's fastest growing megacities.

=== Dealings with Zanzibari slave traders ===
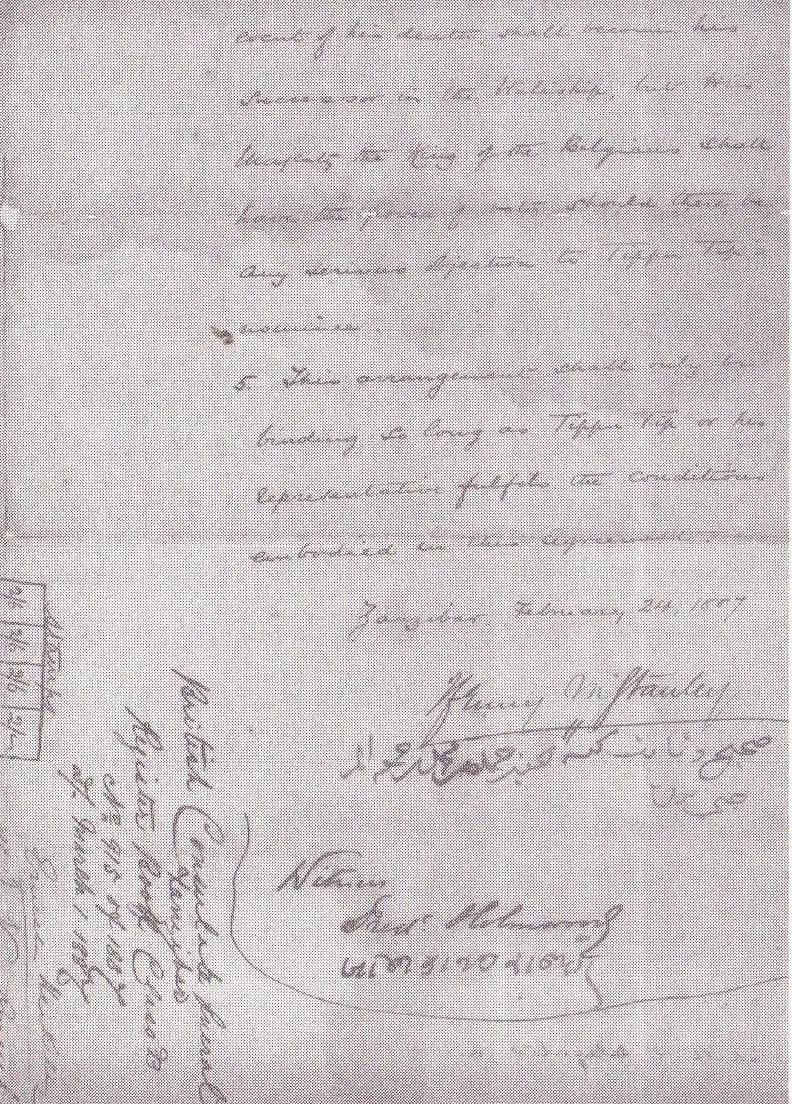
The contract signed between Henry Morton Stanley and Tippu Tip on behalf of King Leopold II at the British consulate in Zanzibar in 1887, in which Leopold appoints Tippu Tip as governor of the Stanley Falls District

Tippu Tip, the most powerful of Zanzibar's slave traders of the 19th century, was well known to Stanley, as was the social chaos and devastation brought by slave-hunting. It had only been through Tippu Tip's help that Stanley had found Livingstone, who had survived years on the Lualaba under Tippu Tip's friendship. Now, Stanley discovered that Tippu Tip's men had reached still further west in search of fresh populations to enslave.

Four years earlier, the Zanzibaris had thought the Congo deadly and impassable and warned Stanley not to attempt to go there, but when Tippu Tip learned that Stanley had survived, he was quick to act. Villages throughout the region were burned and depopulated. Tippu Tip had raided 118 villages, killed 4,000 Africans, and, when Stanley reached his camp, had 2,300 slaves, mostly young women and children, in chains ready to transport halfway across the continent to the markets of Zanzibar.

Having found the new ruler of the Upper Congo, Stanley had no choice but to negotiate an agreement with him, to stop Tip coming further downstream and attacking Leopoldville and other stations. To achieve this, he had to allow Tip to build his final river station just below Stanley Falls, which prevented vessels from sailing further upstream. At the end of his physical resources, Stanley returned home, to be replaced by Lieutenant Colonel Francis de Winton, a former British Army officer.

== Emin Pasha Relief Expedition (1887–1890) ==
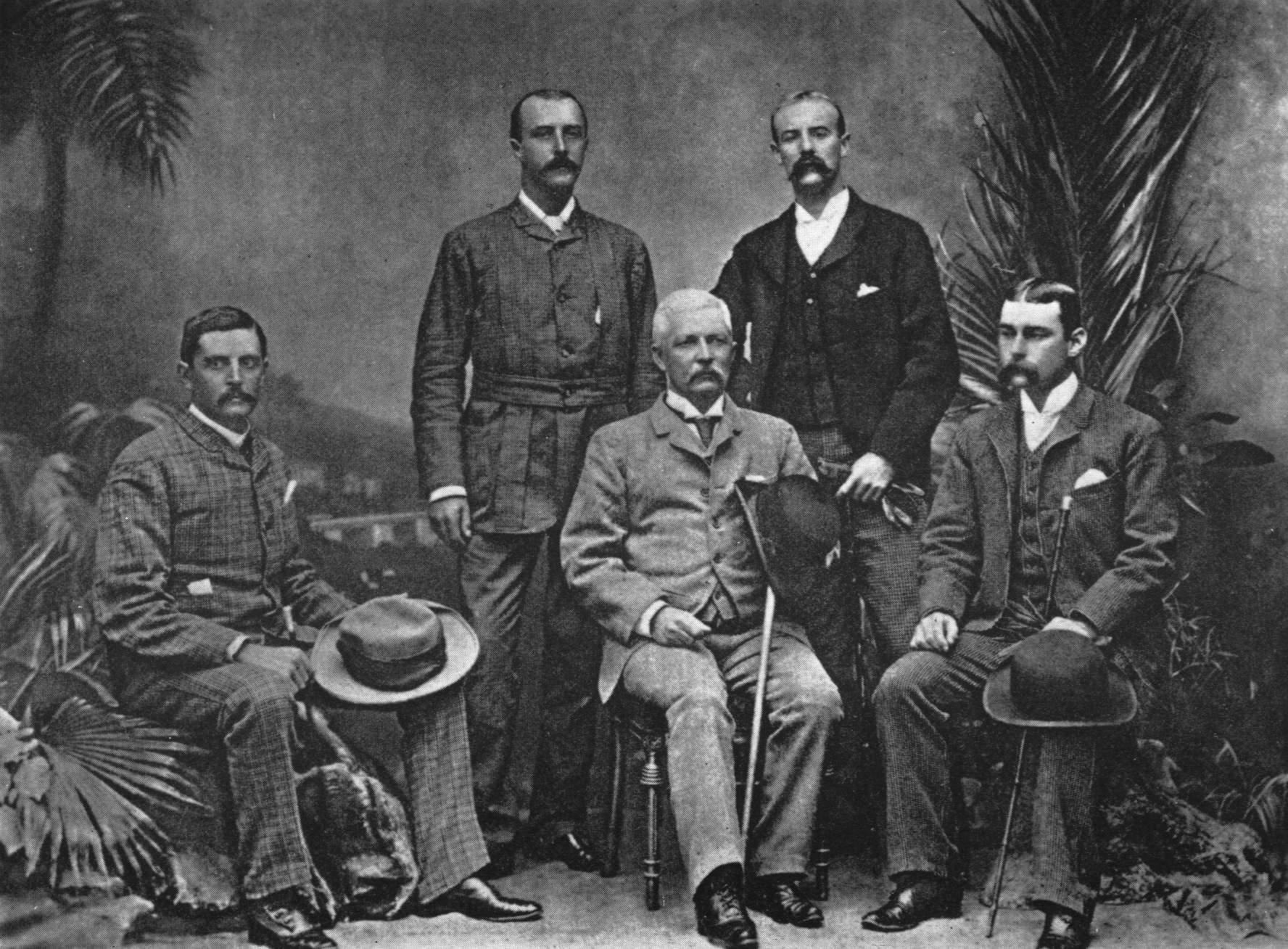
Henry M Stanley with the officers of the Advance Column, Cairo, 1890. From the left: Dr. Thomas Heazle Parke, Robert H. Nelson, Henry M. Stanley, William G. Stairs, and Arthur J. M. Jephson

In 1886, Stanley led the Emin Pasha Relief Expedition to "rescue" Emin Pasha, the governor of Equatoria in the southern Sudan, who was threatened by Mahdist forces. King Leopold II demanded that Stanley take the longer route via the Congo River, hoping to acquire more territory and perhaps even Equatoria. After immense hardships and great loss of life, Stanley met Emin in 1888, mapped the Ruwenzori Range and Lake Edward, and emerged from the interior with Emin and his surviving followers at the end of 1890. Despite its success, this expedition tarnished Stanley's name because of the conduct of the other Europeans on the expedition. Army Major Edmund Musgrave Barttelot was killed by an African porter after behaving with extreme cruelty. James Sligo Jameson, heir to Irish whiskey manufacturer Jameson's, allegedly bought a 10-year-old girl and offered her to cannibals to document and sketch how she was cooked and eaten. Stanley found out only when Jameson had died of fever.

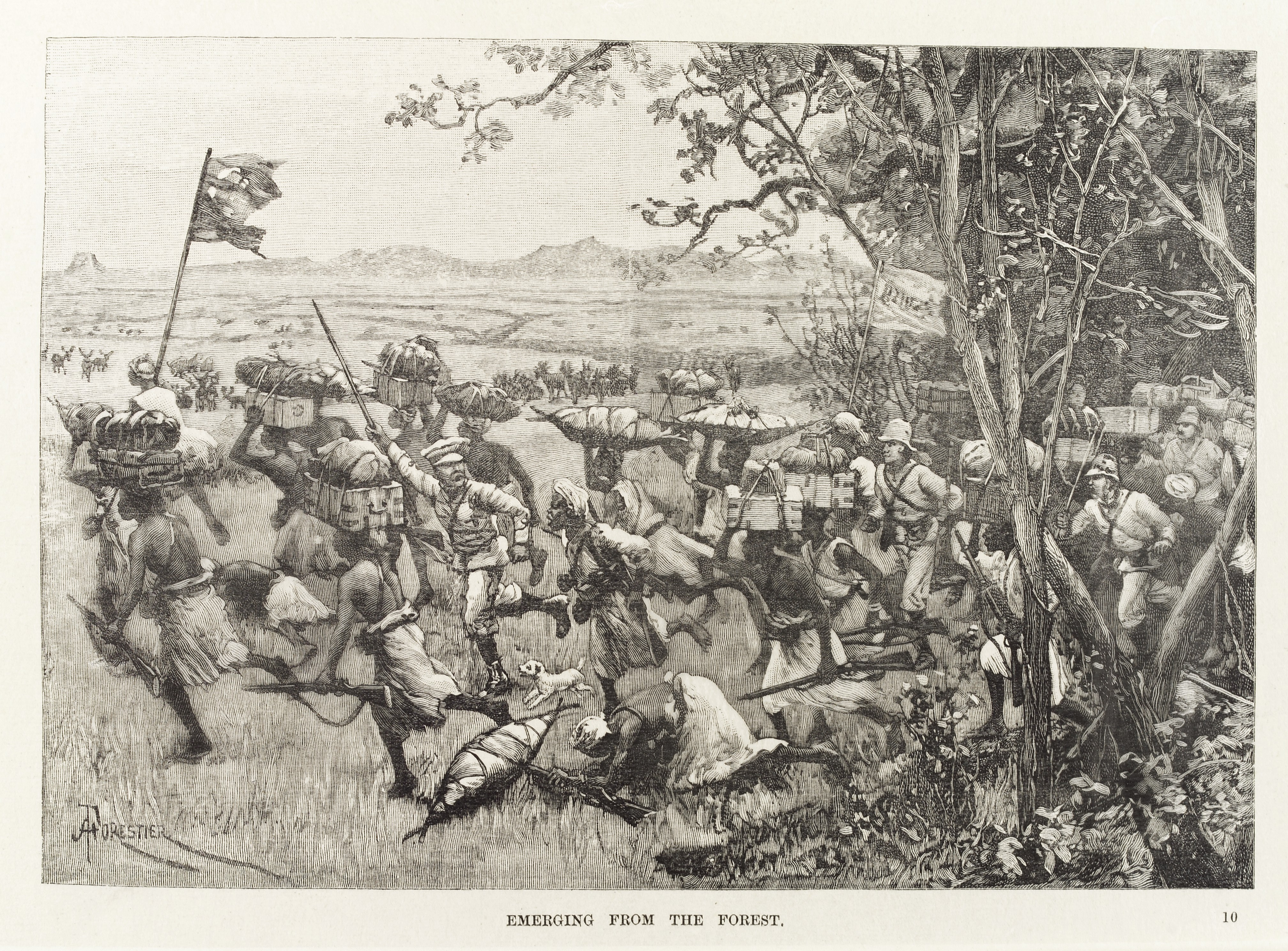
The Emin Pasha Relief Expedition emerging out of the Ituri Rainforest

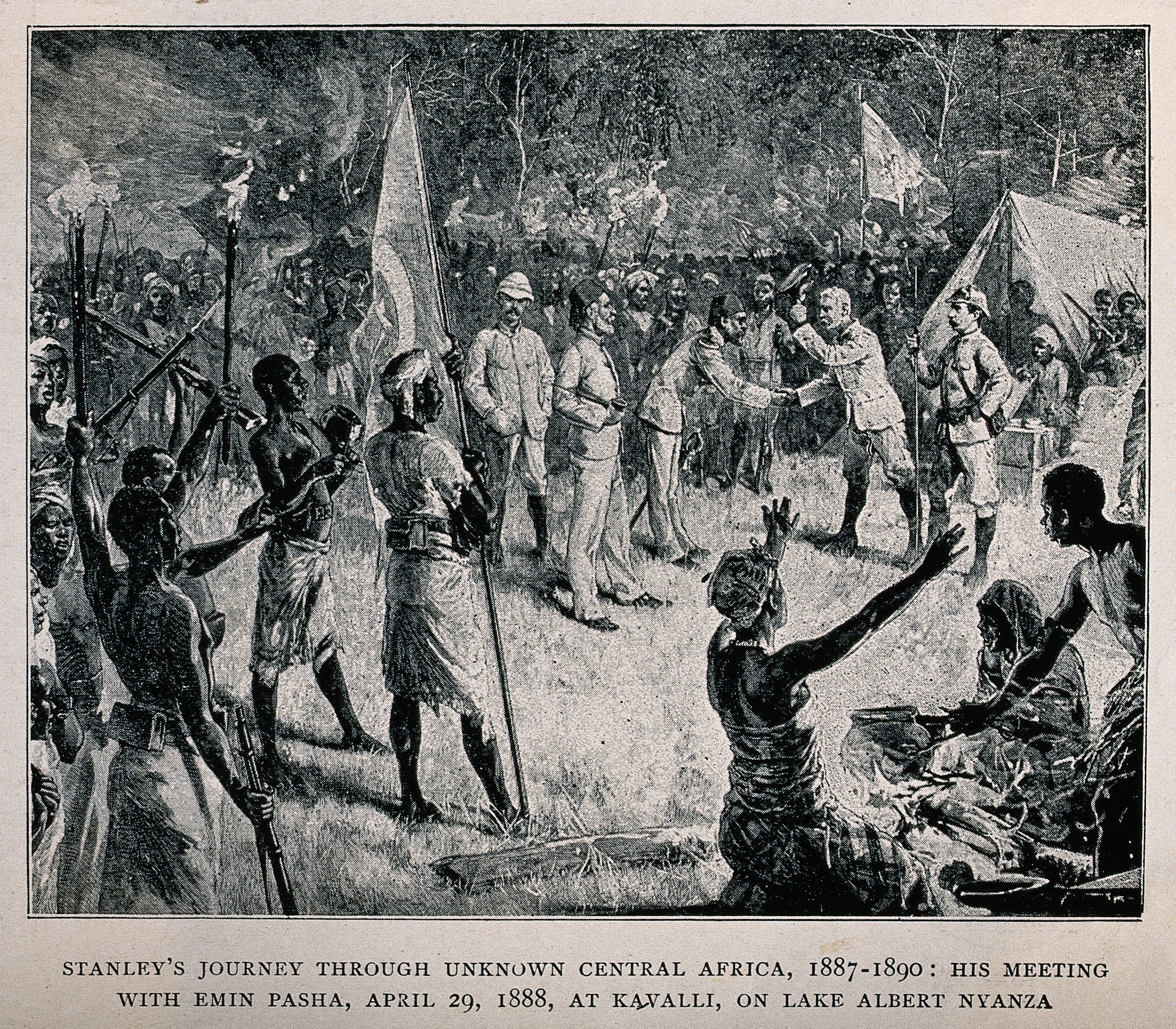
Stanley's meeting with Emin Pasha in 1888

The spread of sleeping sickness across areas of central and eastern Africa that were previously free of the disease has been attributed to this expedition, but this hypothesis has been disputed. Sleeping sickness had been endemic in these regions for generations and then flared into epidemics as colonial trade increased trade throughout Africa during the ensuing decades.

In a number of publications made after the expedition, Stanley asserts that the purpose of the effort was singular; to offer relief to Emin Pasha. For example, he writes the following while explaining the final route decision.

The advantages of the Congo route were about five hundred miles shorter land journey, and less opportunities for deserting. It also quieted the fears of the French and Germans that, behind this professedly humanitarian quest, we might have annexation projects.

However, Stanley's other writings point to a secondary goal which was precisely territorial annexation. He writes in his book on the expedition about his meeting with the Sultan of Zanzibar, when he arrived there at the start of the expedition, and a certain matter that was discussed at that meeting. At first, he is not explicit on the agenda but it is clear enough:

We then entered heartily into our business; how absolutely necessary it was that he should promptly enter into an agreement with the English within the limits assigned by Anglo-German treaty. It would take too long to describe the details of the conversation, but I obtained from him the answer needed.

A few pages further in the same book, Stanley explains what the matter was about and this time, he makes it clear that indeed, it had to do with annexation.

I have settled several little commissions at Zanzibar satisfactorily. One was to get the Sultan to sign the concessions which Mackinnon tried to obtain a long time ago. As the Germans have magnificent territory east of Zanzibar, it was but fair that England should have some portion for the protection she has accorded to Zanzibar since 1841 ... The concession that we wished to obtain embraced a portion of East African coast, of which Mombasa and Malindi were the principal towns. For eight years, to my knowledge, the matter had been placed before His Highness, but the Sultan's signature was difficult to obtain.

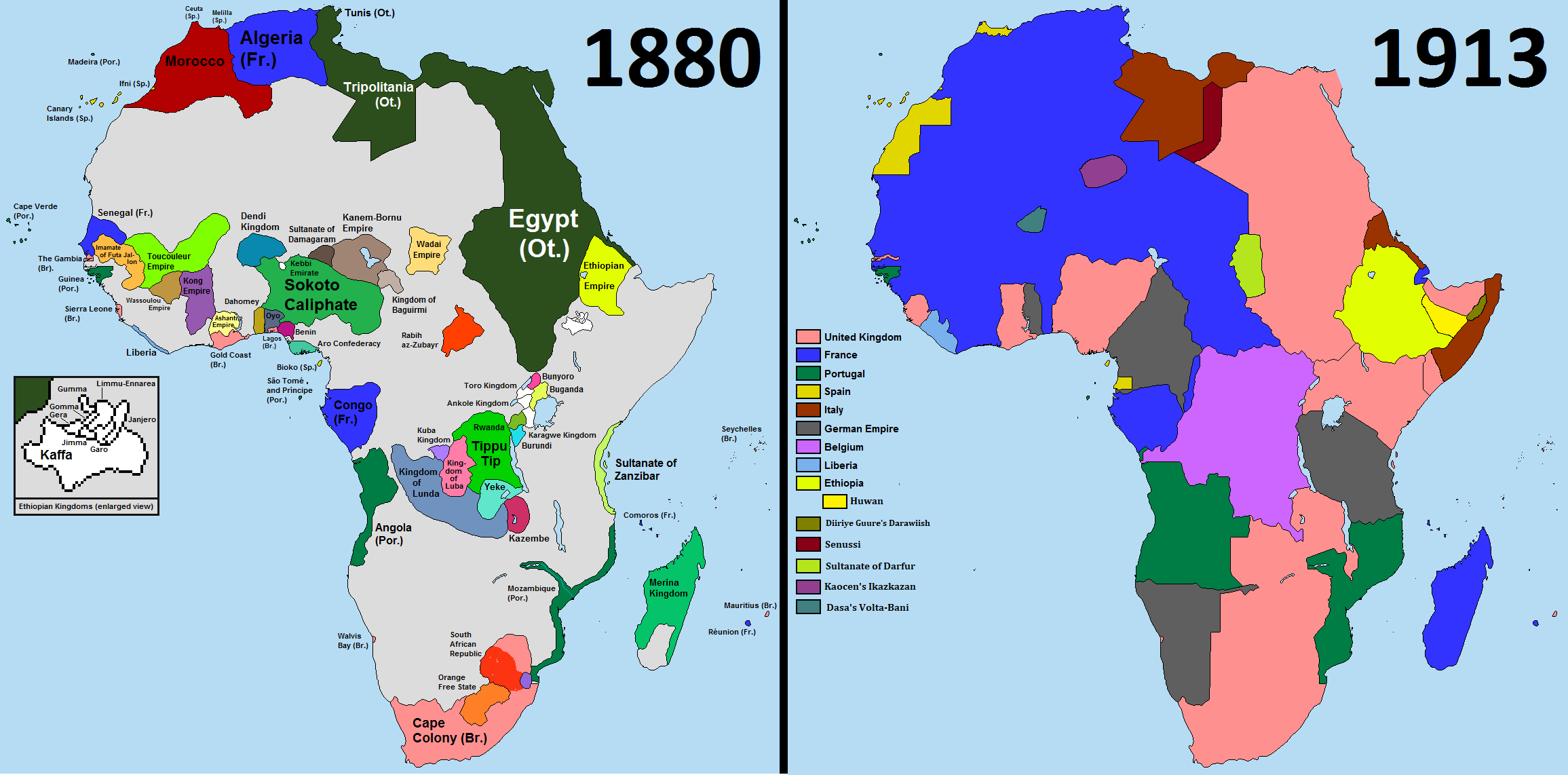
Comparison of Africa in the years 1880 and 1913, showing the 'Scramble for Africa' by the European powers.

The records at the National Archives at Kew, London, offer an even deeper insight and show that annexation was a purpose he had been aware of for the expedition. This is because there are a number of treaties curated there (and gathered by Stanley himself from what is present-day Uganda during the Emin Pasha Expedition), ostensibly gaining British protection for a number of African chiefs. Amongst these were a number that have long been identified as possible frauds. A good example is treaty number 56, supposedly agreed upon between Stanley and the people of "Mazamboni, Katto, and Kalenge". These people had signed over to Stanley, "the Sovereign Right and Right of Government over our country for ever in consideration of value received and for the protection he has accorded us and our Neighbours against KabbaRega and his Warasura."

== Later years ==
Stanley receives the Freedom of the City of London in 1890.

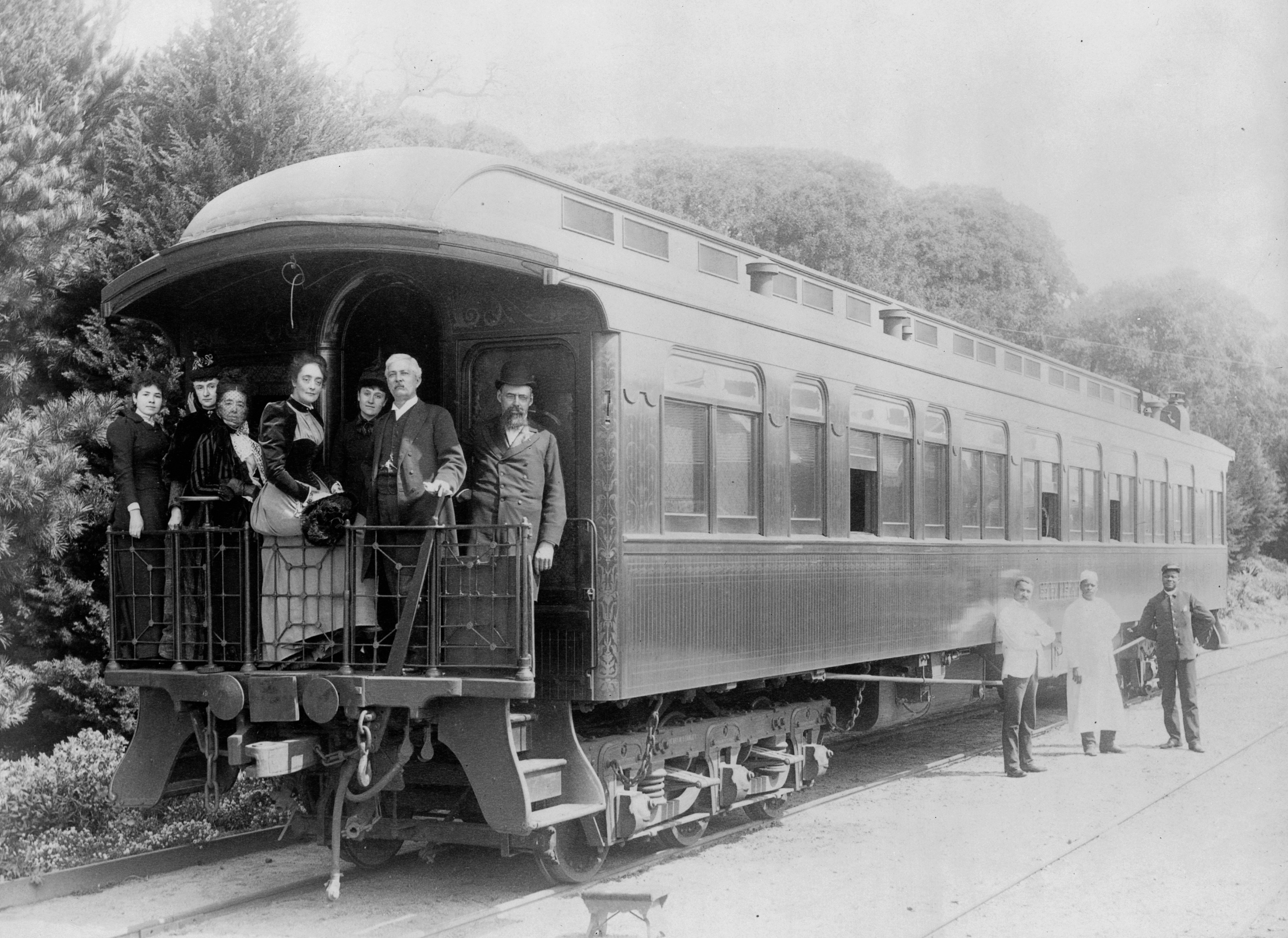
Henry Stanley and party standing on the back of an observation car at Monterey, California, 19 March 1891

On his return to Europe, Stanley married English artist Dorothy Tennant. They adopted a child named Denzil, who was the son of one of Stanley's first cousins, though Stanley concealed this fact from the public and possibly even from Dorothy. Denzil later donated around 300 items to the Stanley archives at the Royal Museum of Central Africa in Tervuren, Belgium in 1954. He died in 1959.

Mainly at his wife's behest, Stanley took up British citizenship and entered Parliament as a Liberal Unionist member for Lambeth North, serving from 1895 to 1900. He disliked politics and made little impression on Parliament. He became Sir Henry Morton Stanley when he was made a Knight Grand Cross of the Order of the Bath in the 1899 Birthday Honours, in recognition of his service to the British Empire in Africa. In 1890, he was given the Grand Cordon of the Order of Leopold by King Leopold II.

Stanley died at his home at 2 Richmond Terrace (nowadays part of Richmond House), Whitehall, London on 10 May 1904. At his funeral, he was eulogised by Daniel P. Virmar. His grave is in the churchyard of St Michael and All Angels' Church in Pirbright, Surrey, marked by a large piece of granite inscribed with the words "Henry Morton Stanley, Bula Matari, 1841–1904, Africa". Bula Matari translates as "Breaker of Rocks" or "Breakstones" in Kongo and was Stanley's name among locals in Congo. It can be translated as a term of endearment for, as the leader of Leopold's expedition, he commonly worked with the labourers breaking rocks with which they built the first modern road along the Congo River. Author Adam Hochschild suggested that Stanley understood it as a heroic epithet, but there is evidence that Nsakala, the man who coined it, had meant it humorously.

== Controversies ==
=== Overview ===
Having survived for ten years of his childhood in the workhouse at St Asaph, it is postulated that he needed as a young man to be thought of as harder and more formidable than other explorers. This made him exaggerate punishments and hostile encounters. It was a serious error of judgement for which his reputation continues to pay a heavy price. In the conclusion to his account of a fight with a fellow boy while in the workhouse, Stanley remarked, "Often since have I learned how necessary is the application of force for the establishment of order. There comes a time when pleading is of no avail." He was accused of indiscriminate cruelty against Africans by contemporaries, which included men who served under him or otherwise had first-hand information. Stanley himself acknowledged, "Many people have called me hard, but they are always those whose presence a field of work could best dispense with, and whose nobility is too nice to be stained with toil."

About society women, Stanley wrote that they were "toys to while slow time" and "trifling human beings." When he met the American journalist and traveller May Sheldon, he was attracted because she was a modern woman who insisted on serious conversation and not social chit-chat. "She soon lets you know that chaff won't do," he wrote. The authors of the book The Congo: Plunder and Resistance tried to argue that Stanley had "a pathological fear of women, an inability to work with talented co-workers, and an obsequious love of the aristocratic rich." This is not only at odds with his opinions about society women, but Stanley's intimate correspondence in the Royal Museum of Central Africa, between him and his two fiancées, Katie Gough Roberts and Alice Pike, as well as between him and the American journalist May Sheldon, and between him and his wife Dorothy Tennant, shows that he enjoyed close relationships with those women, but both Roberts and Pike ultimately rejected him when he refused to abandon his protracted travels.

When Stanley married Dorothy, he invited his friend, Arthur Mounteney Jephson, to visit while they were on their honeymoon. Dr. Thomas Parke also came because Stanley was seriously ill at the time. Stanley's good relations with these two colleagues from the Emin Pasha Expedition could possibly be seen as demonstrating that he could get along with colleagues.

=== General opinion about African people ===
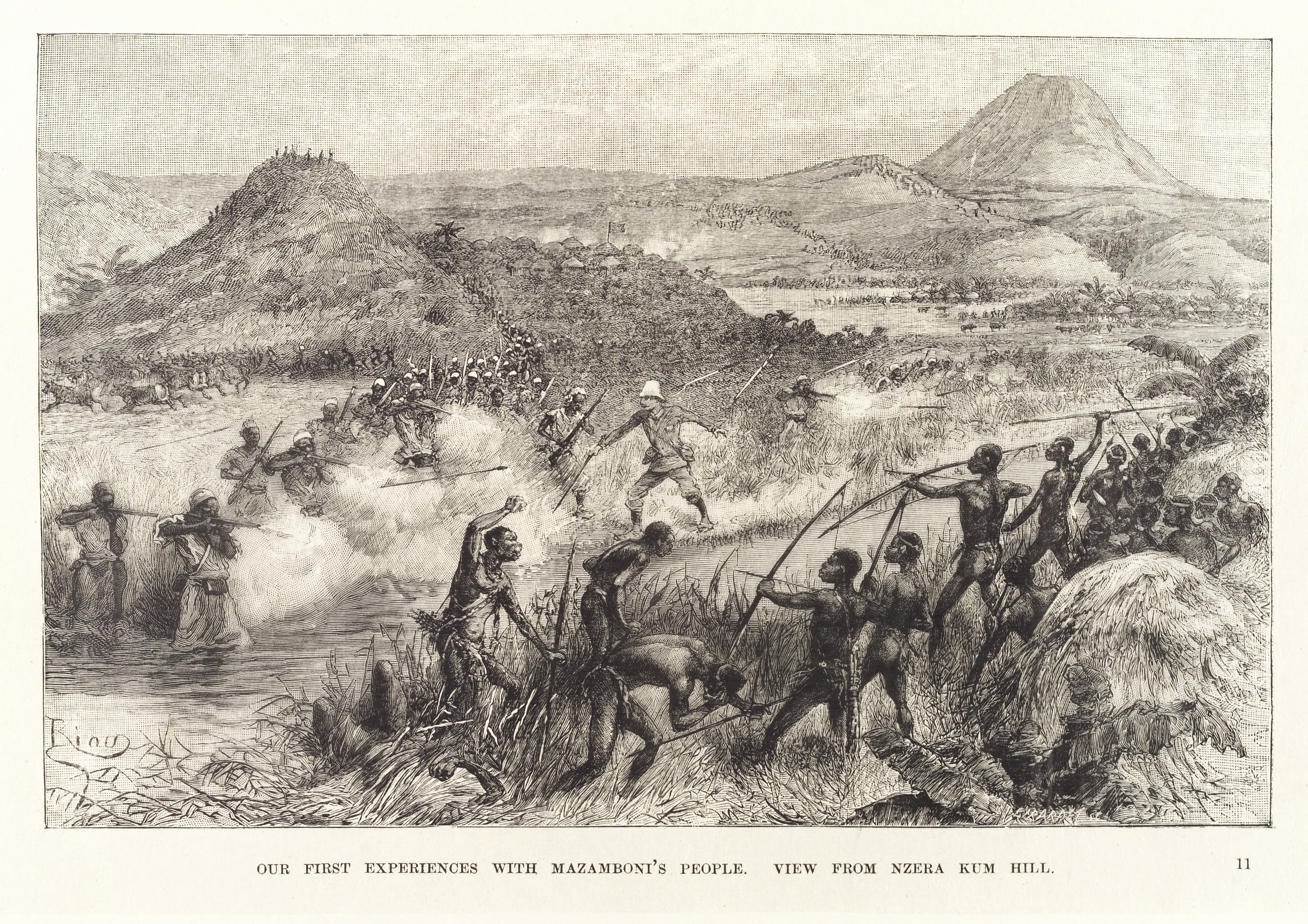
Stanley's expedition under attack

In Through the Dark Continent, Stanley observed the peoples of the region, and wrote that "the savage only respects force, power, boldness, and decision". Stanley further wrote: "If Europeans will only ... study human nature in the vicinity of Stanley Pool (Kinshasa), they will go home thoughtful men, and may return again to this land to put to good use the wisdom they should have gained ... during their peaceful sojourn."

In How I Found Livingstone (1872), Stanley wrote that he was "prepared to admit any black man possessing the attributes of true manhood, or any good qualities ... to a brotherhood with myself." Stanley insulted and shouted at William Grant Stairs and Arthur Jephson for mistreating the Wangwana. He described the history of Boma as "two centuries of pitiless persecution of black men by sordid whites". He also wrote about what he thought was the superior beauty of black people in comparison with whites. According to Jeal, Stanley was not a racist, unlike his contemporaries Sir Richard Burton and Sir Samuel Baker.

=== Opinion about mixed African-Arab peoples ===
The Wangwana of Zanzibar were of mixed Arabian and African ancestry: "Africanized Arabs", in Stanley's words. They became the backbone of all his major expeditions and were referred to as "his dear pets" by sceptical young officers on the Emin Pasha Expedition, who resented their leader for favouring the Wangwana above themselves. "All are dear to me", Stanley told William Grant Stairs and Arthur Jephson, "who do their duty and the Zanzibaris have quite satisfied me on this and on previous expeditions." Stanley came to think of an individual Wangwana as "superior in proportion to his wages to ten Europeans". When Stanley first met a group of his Wangwana assistants, he was surprised: "They were an exceedingly fine looking body of men, far more intelligent in appearance than I could ever have believed African barbarians could be".

On the other hand, in one of his books, Stanley said about mixed Afro-Arab people: "For the half-castes I have great contempt. They are neither black nor white, neither good nor bad, neither to be admired nor hated. They are all things, at all times ... If I saw a miserable, half-starved negro, I was always sure to be told, he belonged to a half-caste. Cringing and hypocritical, cowardly and debased, treacherous and mean ... this syphilitic, blear-eyed, pallid-skinned, abortion of an Africanized Arab."

=== Accounts of cruel treatment toward African people ===
The British House of Commons appointed a committee to investigate missionary reports of Stanley's mistreatment of native populations in 1871, which was likely secured by Horace Waller, a member on the committee of the Anti-slavery Society and fellow of the Royal Geographical Society. The British vice consul in Zanzibar, John Kirk (Waller's brother-in-law) conducted the investigation. Stanley was charged with excessive violence, wanton destruction, the selling of labourers into slavery, the sexual exploitation of native women and the plundering of villages for ivory and canoes. Kirk's report to the British Foreign Office was never published, but in it, he claimed: "If the story of this expedition were known it would stand in the annals of African discovery unequalled for the reckless use of power that modern weapons placed in his hands over natives who never before heard a gun fired."

When Kirk was appointed to investigate reports of brutality against Stanley, he was delighted because he had hated Stanley for almost a decade. Firstly, for having publicly exposed him (Kirk) for having failed to send provisions to Livingstone from Zanzibar during the late 1860s; secondly, because Stanley had revealed in the press that Kirk had sent slaves to David Livingstone as porters, rather than the free men Livingstone had made very plain he wanted. Kirk was related to Horace Waller by marriage; and so Waller also hated Stanley on Kirk's behalf. He used his membership of the executive committee of the Universities Mission to Central Africa to persuade J. P. Farler (a missionary in East Africa) to name Stanley's assistants who might provide evidence against the explorer and be prepared to be interviewed by Kirk in Zanzibar.

An American merchant in Zanzibar, Augustus Sparhawk, wrote that several of Stanley's African assistants, including Manwa Sera, "a big rascal and too fond of money", had been bribed to tell Kirk what he wanted to hear. Stanley was accused, in Kirk's report, of cruelty to his Wangwana carriers and guards whom he idolised and who re-enlisted with him again and again. He wrote to the owner of the Daily Telegraph, insisting that he (Lawson) force the British government to send a warship to take the Wangwana home to Zanzibar and to pay all their back wages. If a ship was not sent, they would die on their overland journey home. The ship was sent. Stanley's hatred of the promiscuity that had caused his illegitimacy and his legendary shyness with women, made the Kirk report's claim that he had accepted an African mistress offered to him by Kabaka Mutesa exceedingly implausible. Both Stanley and his colleague, Frank Pocock, loathed slavery and the slave trade and wrote about this loathing in letters and diaries at this time, which speaks against the likelihood that they sold their own men. The report was never shown to Stanley, so he had been unable to defend himself.

In a letter to the Secretary of the Royal Geographical Society in the 1870s, Conservative MP and treasurer of the Aborigines' Protection Society, Sir Robert Fowler, who believed Kirk's report and refused to "whitewash Stanley", insisted that his "heartless butchery of unfortunate natives has brought dishonour on the British flag and must have rendered the course of future travellers more perilous and difficult." General Charles George Gordon remarked in a letter to Richard Francis Burton that Stanley shared Samuel Baker's tendency to write openly about deploying firearms against Africans in self-defense: "These things may be done, but not advertised", Burton himself wrote that Stanley "shoots negros as if they were monkeys" in an October 1876 letter to Kirk. He also loathed Stanley for disproving his long-held theory that Lake Tanganyika, which he was the first European to discover, was the true source of the Nile, which may have influenced Burton to misrepresent Stanley's activities in Africa.

In 1877, not long after one of Stanley's expeditions, Farler met with African porters who had been part of the expedition and wrote, "Stanley's followers give dreadful accounts to their friends of the killing of inoffensive natives, stealing their ivory and goods, selling their captives, and so on. I do think a commission ought to inquire into these charges, because if they are true, it will do untold harm to the great cause of emancipating Africa ... I cannot understand all the killing that Stanley has found necessary". Stanley, when reporting the American Indian Wars as a young reporter, had been encouraged by his editors to exaggerate the number of Indians killed by the US Army. The legacy for Stanley, of being a helpless illegitimate boy, deserted by both parents, was a deep sense of inferiority that could only be kept at bay by claims of being much more powerful and feared than he was. Tim Jeal, in his biography of Stanley, has shown by a study of Stanley's diary and his colleague Frank Pocock's diary that on almost every occasion when there was conflict with Africans on the Congo in 1875–76, Stanley exaggerated the scale of the conflict and the deaths on both sides. On 14 February 1877, according to his colleague, Frank Pocock's diary, Stanley's nine canoes, and his sectional boat the Lady Alice, were attacked and followed by eight canoes, crewed by Africans with firearms. In Stanley's book, Through the Dark Continent, Stanley inflated this incident into a major battle, by increasing the number of hostile canoes to 60 and adjusting the casualties accordingly.

Stanley wrote with some measure of satisfaction when describing how Captain John Hanning Speke, the first European to visit Uganda, had been punched in the teeth for disobedience to Sidi Mubarak Bombay, a caravan leader also employed by Stanley, which made Stanley claim that he would never allow Bombay to have the audacity to stand up for a boxing match with him. In the same paragraph, Stanley described how he several months later administered punishment to the African. William Grant Stairs found Stanley during the Emin Pasha expedition to be cruel, secretive and selfish. John Rose Troup, in his book about the Emin Pasha expedition, said that he saw Stanley's self-serving and vindictive side: "In the forgoing letter he brings forward disgraceful charges, that really do not refer to me at all, although he blames me for what happened. The injustice of his accusations, made as they are without documentary or, as far as I can learn, any evidence, can hardly be made clear to the public, but they must be aware, when they read what has preceded this correspondence, that he has acted as no one in his position should have acted".

A counterpoint is that later in life Stanley rebuked subordinates for inflicting needless corporal punishment. For beating one of his most trusted African servants, he told Lieutenant Carlos Branconnier "that cruelty was not permissible" and that he would dismiss him for a future offence, and he did. Stanley was admired by Arthur Jephson, whom William Bonny, the acerbic medical assistant, described as the "most honourable" officer on the expedition. Jephson wrote, "Stanley never fights where there is the smallest chance of making friends with the natives and he is wonderfully patient & long suffering with them". Writer Tim Jeal has argued that during Stanley's 1871 expedition, he treated his indigenous porters well under "contemporary standards."

=== Possible inspiration for Heart of Darkness ===
The legacy of death and destruction in the Congo region during the Free State period and the fact that Stanley had worked for Leopold are considered by author Norman Sherry to have made him an inspiration for Joseph Conrad's Heart of Darkness. Conrad had spent six months of 1890 as a steamship captain on the Congo, years after Stanley had been there (1879–1884) and five years after Stanley had been recalled to Europe and ceased to be Leopold's chief agent in Africa.

== Works by Stanley ==
- How I Found Livingstone: Travels, Adventures and Discoveries in Central Africa: Including an Account of Four Months' Residence with Dr. Livingstone. Scribner, Armstrong. 1872. ISBN 978-0-524-08786-2.
- Coomassie and Magdala: The Story of Two British Campaigns in Africa. London: Sampson Low, Marston & Co. 1874.
- Through the Dark Continent; Or, The Sources of the Nile: Around the Great Lakes of Equatorial Africa and Down the Livingstone River to the Atlantic Ocean. Sampson Low, Marston, Searle, Rivington. 1878.
- The Congo and the Founding of Its Free State: A Story of Work and Exploration. Harper & Brothers. 1885. ISBN 978-0-403-00288-7.
- In Darkest Africa; Or, The Quest, Rescue, and Retreat of Emin, Governor of Equatoria. Scribner. 1890.
- My Dark Companions and Their Strange Stories. New York: Scribner. 1893.
- Slavery and the Slave Trade in Africa. New York: Harper & Brothers. 1893.
- The Autobiography of Sir Henry Morton Stanley. Houghton Mifflin. 1909. ISBN 978-0-8371-1963-2.
- Stanley, Richard; Neame, Alan, eds. (1961). The Exploration Diaries: Of H. M. Stanley. Now First Published from the Original Manuscripts. Kimber.
- Bennett, Norman Robert, ed. (1970). Stanley's Despatches to the New York Herald: 1871–1872, 1874–1877. Boston: Boston University Press. hdl:2144/23144. ISBN 978-0-8419-8706-7.

== Works depicting Stanley ==
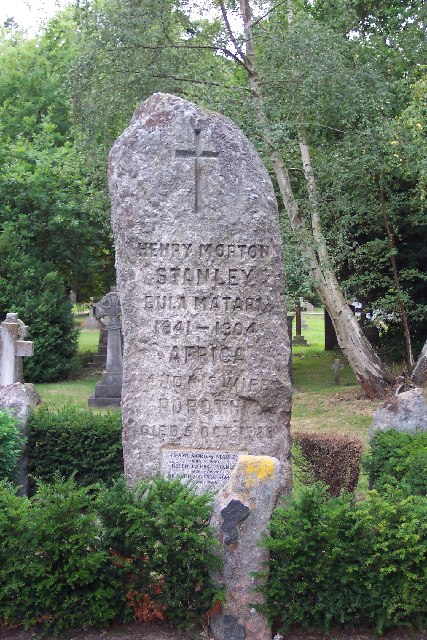
Henry Morton Stanley's grave in Pirbright, Surrey

- Stanley and Livingstone, a 1939 film, stars Spencer Tracy as Stanley and Cedric Hardwicke as Livingstone.
- Stanley was portrayed by Ed Kemmer in a 1962 episode, "The Truth Teller", of the syndicated television anthology series, Death Valley Days. In the story, investigative reporter Stanley arrives at Fort Larned in Kansas to assess Gen. Winfield Scott Hancock's success in avoiding war on the frontier.
- In 1971, the BBC produced a six-part docudrama series entitled Search for the Nile. Much of the series was shot on location, with Stanley played by Keith Buckley.
- Stanley appears as a character in Simon Gray's 1978 play The Rear Column. The play tells the story of the men left behind to wait for Tippu Tib while Stanley went on to relieve Emin Pasha.
- Stanley was portrayed by Aidan Quinn in the TV movie Forbidden Territory: Stanley's Search for Livingstone (1997).
- A Nintendo video game based on his life was released in 1992 called Stanley: The Search for Dr. Livingston.
- In 2004, Welsh journalist Tim Butcher wrote his book Blood River: A Journey to Africa's Broken Heart. The book followed Stanley's journey through the Congo.
- The 2009 History Channel series Expedition Africa documented a group of explorers attempting to traverse the route of Stanley's expedition in search of Livingstone.
- Oscar Hijuelos's 2015 novel Twain & Stanley Enter Paradise retells the story of Stanley's life through a focus on his real-life friendship with Mark Twain.

== Honours and legacy ==
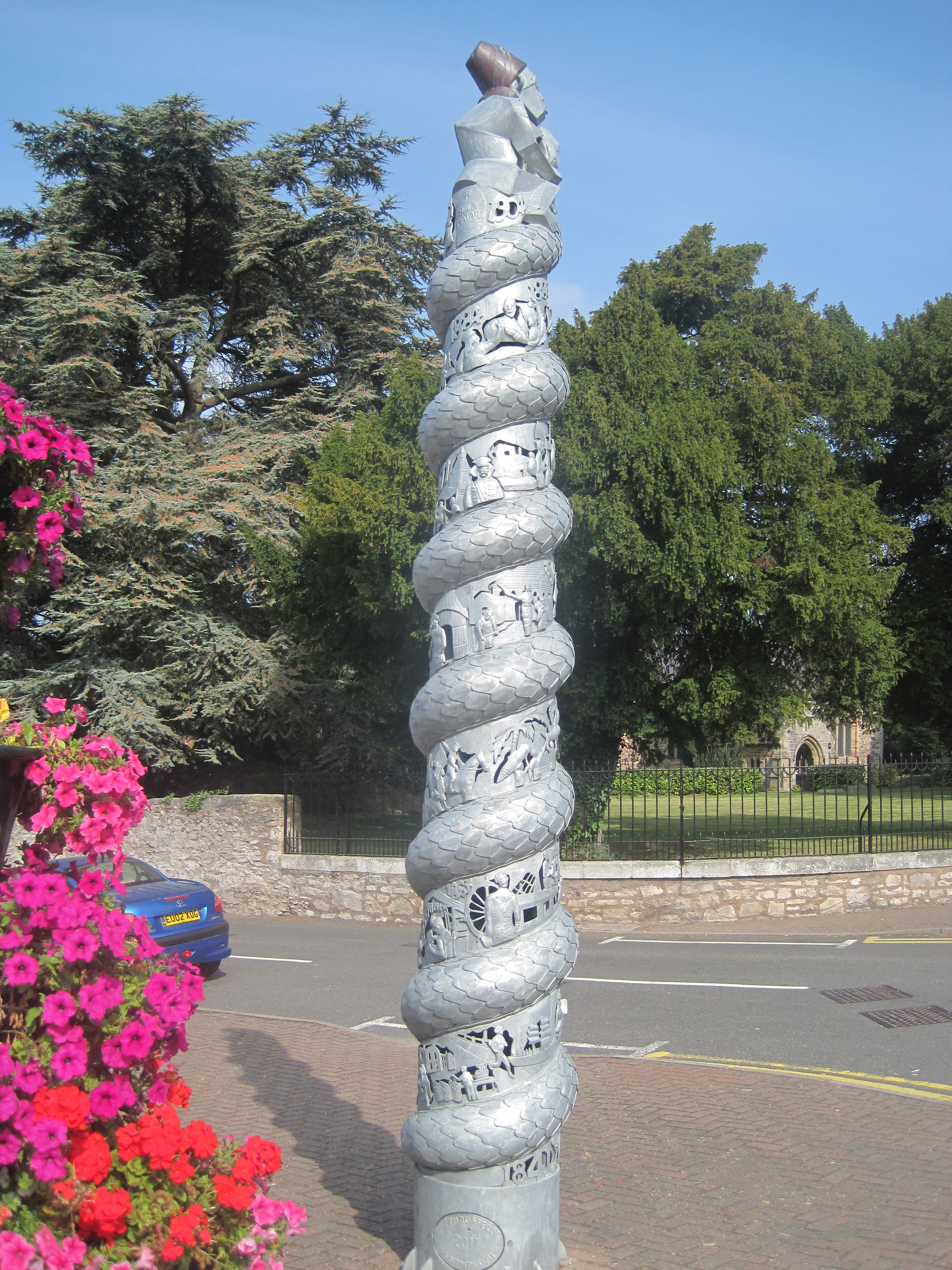
Memorial to H. M. Stanley in St Asaph

A former hospital in St Asaph, north Wales, was named after Stanley in honour of his birth in the area. It was formerly the workhouse in which he spent much of his early life. Memorials to Stanley were erected in St Asaph and in Denbigh (a statue of Stanley with an outstretched hand, by Nick Elphick) in 2011. A working party was set up in 2020 to consider new wording for a plaque on the St Asaph obelisk, and a public consultation and vote was held in 2021 over a proposal to remove the Denbigh statue, which resulted in an 80 per cent majority for retaining the statue.

Taxa named in honour of Stanley include:

- freshwater snail Gabbiella stanleyi (E. A. Smith, 1877)
- freshwater snail genus Stanleya Bourguignat, 1885

The mineral stanleyite is named in his honour, as the describer of the mineral was surnamed Livingstone but a mineral named livingstonite (named for David Livingstone) already existed.

Stanley Electric, a major Japanese supplier of automotive lighting, was named by founder Takaharu Kitano after Stanley in admiration of his "perseverance and pioneering spirit".

== Arms ==
Coat of arms of Stanley of Furze Hill
| Crest On a wreath of the colours, an African shield in front of two assegais in saltire points upwards all Proper Escutcheon Gules, a fesse wavy barry wavy of four, Argent and Azure; on a pale of the second a representation o the Continent of Africa Sable, a chief Or thereon two negroes' [sic] heads couped Proper. Supporters Dexter, a lamb murally crowned, in the mouth an olive branch, supporting the banner of Jerusalem; sinister, a tiger guard, navally crowned, in the mouth a palm branch, supporting the Union flag of Great Britain, with the inscription, 'Jerusalem, 1799' upon the cross of St. George. Motto Bula matari |

== List of Stanley's expeditions ==
| Expedition | Date |
|---|---|
| British expedition to Abyssinia | 1867–1868 |
| Search for Livingstone | 1871–1872 |
| Third Ashanti war Expedition | 1873–1873 |
| First trans-Africa expedition | 1874–1877 |
| International Upper Congo Expedition | 1879–1884 |
| Emin Pasha Relief Expedition | 1887–1890 |

== See also ==
- Edmund Musgrave Barttelot
- H.M. Stanley Hospital
- Christian manliness

== Notes ==
Parliament of the United Kingdom
| Preceded by Francis Moses Coldwells | Member of Parliament for Lambeth North; 1895 – 1900 | Succeeded by Frederick William Horner |
