= Maximilien Strauch =

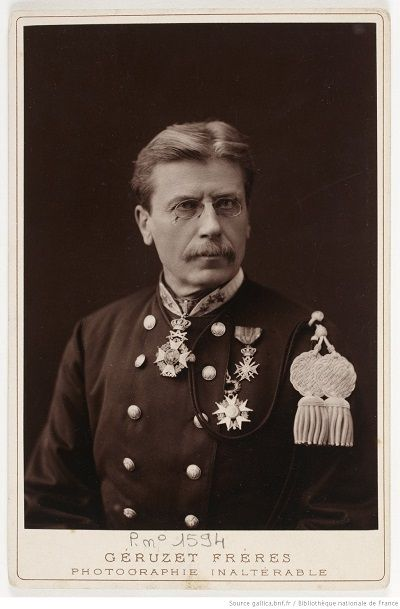
Portrait of Maximilien Strauch

Colonel Maximilien Charles Ferdinand Strauch (Lomprez, 4 October 1829 – Beez, 7 June 1911) was a Belgian officer who played a role in the colonization of the Congo Basin. He was a trusted advisor of King Leopold II of Belgium, who entrusted him with the functions of secretary-general of the Association internationale africaine (1878), secretary of the Comité d'études du Haut-Congo (1878) and chairman of the Association internationale du Congo (23 February 1885 – 1 July 1885).

== Publications ==
- "Au sujet du voyage des éléphants", in: Bulletin de la Société Royale de Géographie, 1879–1880, p. 216
- "Au sujet du choix de Karéma", in: Bulletin de la Société Royale de Géographie, 1879–1880, p. 39

== Literature ==
- René Cambier, STRAUCH (Maximilien-Charles-Ferdinand), in: Biographie Coloniale Belge, deel III, 1952, kol. 831–833
- A. J. Wauters, Le colonel Strauch, président de l'Association internationale du Congo, M. Weissenbruch, 1911
