= International Association of the Congo =

1879 organization founded by Leopold II of Belgium for exploiting the Congo

Coordinates: 2.88°S 23.656°E

International Congo Society Association internationale du Congo
- 1879–1885
- Flag
- Capital: Boma
- Government: Corporatocracy
- Sovereign
  - 1885–1908: Leopold II of Belgium
- Historical era: New Imperialism
  - Established: 17 November 1879
  - Flag recognised: 10 April 1884
  - Sovereignty recognised: 8 November 1884
  - Free State established: 1 July 1885
| Preceded by | Succeeded by |
| International African Association | Congo Free State; Kingdom of Kongo |
- Today part of: Democratic Republic of Congo

The International Association of the Congo (French: Association internationale du Congo), also known as the International Congo Society, was an association founded on 17 November 1879 by Leopold II of Belgium to further his interests in the Congo. It replaced the Belgian Committee for Studies of the Upper Congo (Comité d'Études du Haut-Congo) which was part of the International African Association front organisation created for the exploitation of the Congo. The goals of the International Congo Society was to establish control of the Congo Basin and to exploit its economic resources. The Berlin Conference recognised the society as sovereign over the territories it controlled, and on August 1, 1885, i.e. four and half months after the closure of the Berlin Conference, King Leopold's Vice-Administrator General in the Congo announced that the society and the territories it occupied were henceforth called "the Congo Free State".

== Ownership and control ==
The official stockholders of the Committee for the Study of the Upper Congo were Dutch and British businessmen and a Belgian banker who was holding shares on behalf of Leopold. Colonel Maximilien Strauch, president of the committee, was an appointee of Leopold. It was not made clear to Henry Morton Stanley, who signed a five-year contract to establish bases in the Congo in 1878, whether he was working for the International African Association, the Committee for Studies of the Upper Congo, or Leopold himself. Stanley's European employee contracts forbade disclosure of the true nature of their work.

== Berlin Conference ==
The Berlin Conference or Congo Conference of 1884–85 regulated European colonisation and trade in Africa. King Leopold II was able to convince the powers at the conference that common trade in Africa was in the best interests of all countries. The General Act of the conference divided Africa between the main powers of Europe and confirmed the territory controlled by the Congo Society as its private property, which essentially made it the property of Leopold II.

On 10 April 1884 the United States Senate authorised President Chester A. Arthur "to recognize the flag of the AIC as the equal of that of an allied government". On 8 November 1884 Germany recognised the sovereignty of the society over the Congo.

== See also ==
- Corporatocracy
- Brussels Anti-Slavery Conference 1889–90
- Brussels Conference Act of 1890
- Royal Museum for Central Africa
- List of boats used for exploration of the Congo
