= Émile Banning =

Belgian civil servant

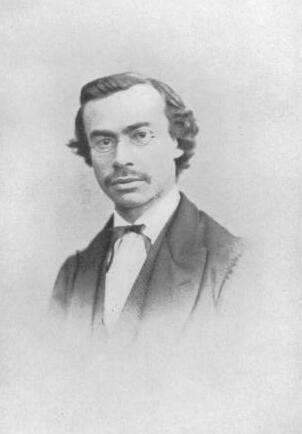
Émile Banning at the time of his marriage. (1872)

Émile Theodore Joseph Hubert Banning (12 October 1836 – 13 July 1898) was a doctor of philosophy and literature and a Belgian senior civil servant who played an important role in the Belgian politics of the 19th century.

Born in Liège, Banning started his career as a journalist with the l'Écho du Parlement, where he became an observer of the political life, after a stay at the Royal Library as its archivist and librarian, he was appointed to the department of Foreign Affairs where he quickly became a kind of oracle in all the historical and geographical questions of his time.

From a "simple" historian he became a leading actor of the great decisions in matters of Belgian domestic as well as international policy. His knowledge of the world was of great support to Leopold II of Belgium, even if the king moved away more and more from the advice of Banning.

Émile Banning was a leading negotiator at the Berlin Conference of 1884 and the Brussels Conference of 1890 both involving the Congo. His political doctrines, based on high international morality and the respect of the law of nations, influenced many Belgian personalities such as Pierre Orts.

He died in Brussels on 13 July 1898.

== See also ==
- Brussels Geographic Conference

== Sources ==
- Carlier, J., Les idées d'Emile Banning sur la neutralité et la défense du pays, in : Revue de Belgique, febr. 1901, p. 105-118.
- Cousin, P., Un grand commis d'Etat : Emile Banning, in : Res Publica, 1959, nr. 2, p. 157-161.
- Leclère, L., Deux livres d'Emile Banning, in : Le Flambeau, 1927, nr. 12, p. 361-371.
- Fondation du Congo, Memoires de Emile Banning, 1927
