= John Farler =

Anglican priest (1845–1907)

John Prediger Farler (1845–1907) was an Anglican priest, most notably Archdeacon of Magila from 1879 until 1889.

== Life story ==
Farler was baptised at St Mary Redcliffe on 17 June 1845, and educated at St John's College, Cambridge. He was ordained in 1874. After a curacy in Lambourn he was Chaplain to Edward Steere, the Bishop of Nyasaland from 1875 to 1882. On his return to England he was the incumbent at St Giles, Reading before returning to Nyasaland in 1895. He died there on 30 May 1907.

== Bibliography ==
- "The Work of Christ in Central Africa," London, Rivingtons, 1878.
