= Brussels Geographic Conference =

Geographic conference held during the Scramble for Africa

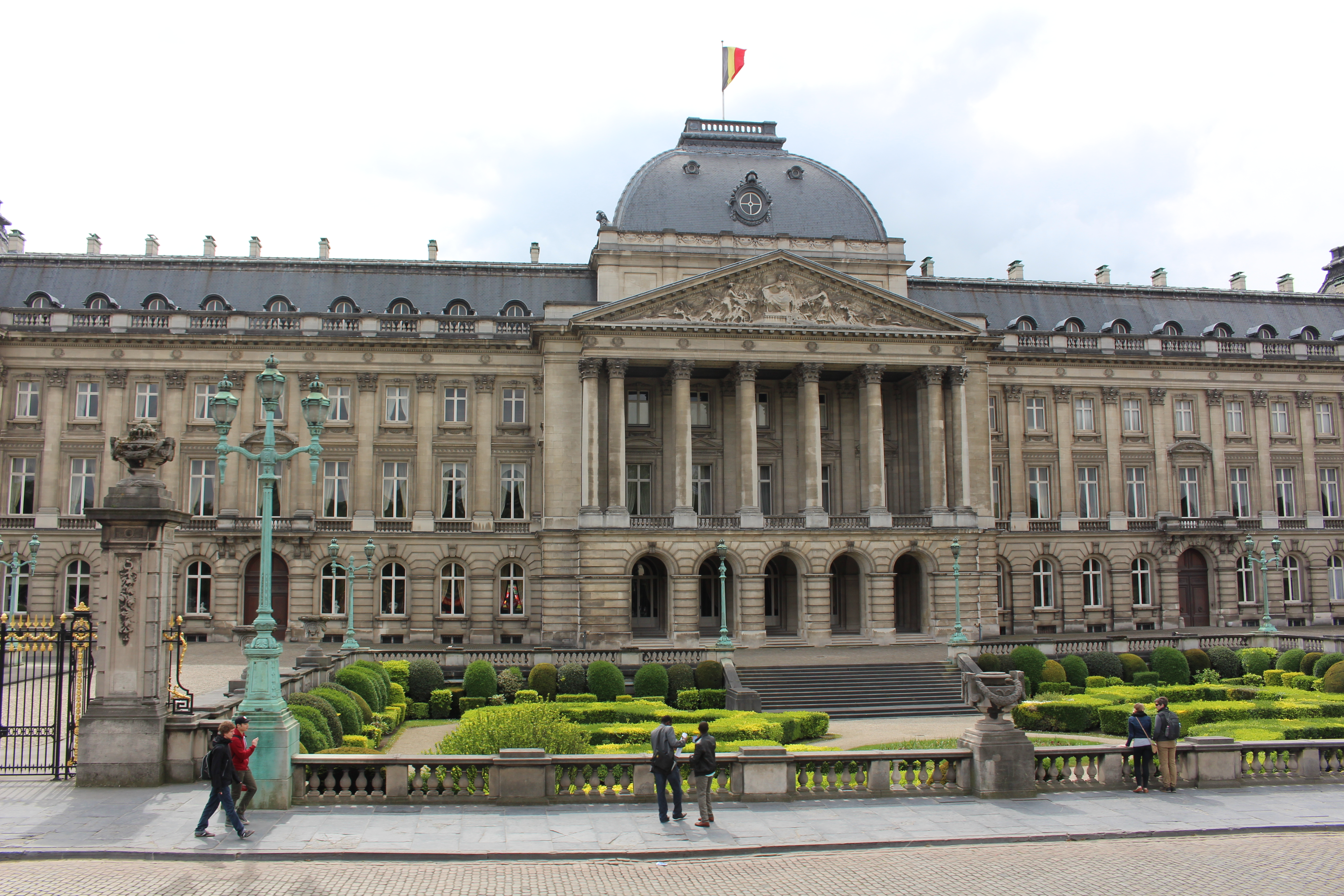

The Brussels Geographic Conference was held in Brussels, Belgium in September 1876 at the request of King Leopold II of Belgium. At the conference were invited nearly forty well-known experts, mainly they were schooled in the geographic sciences or were wealthy philanthropists. Before the guests returned to their respective countries, they voted to establish the International African Association. This initiative would in the end pave the way for the creation of Congo Free State.

== See also ==
- Berlin Conference

== Sources ==
- Émile Banning, Africa and the Brussels geographical conference, translated by Richard Henry Major, London : Sampson Low, Marston, Searle & Rivington, 1877
- Fondation du Congo, Memoires de Emile Banning, 1927
