= Committee for Studies of the Upper Congo =

The Committee for Studies of the Upper Congo, or in French the Comité d'études du Haut-Congo, was formed in 1878 on behalf of Leopold II, King of the Belgians, as part of the Scramble for Africa.

At Leopold's request, the committee was formed by a number of bankers and traders in Belgium and abroad, who contributed funds. The King had initially wanted to recruit Pierre Savorgnan de Brazza as an explorer, but he was hired by the French. Henry Morton Stanley was approached instead; in autumn 1878, he agreed to work for the Committee for five years, and in January 1879, he presented to the committee a detailed proposal for further exploring the Congo. The Committee supported this mission, and Stanley secretly left Antwerp on a freighter in June 1879, arriving in July at the mouth of the Congo River. Stanley was given orders to get territorial concessions from local tribal rulers.

== Goals ==
The committee was founded, ostensibly, with the goals of:

- Assess the navigability of the Congo River;
- Assess the potential for European trade with the inhabitants of the region;
- Discover what entrance costs might be charged by the tribes;
- Learn the nature of local trade goods;
- Investigate the possibility of creating a railway in the area of the waterfalls (now known as Livingstone Falls), and the goods to be transported.

However, the King privately instructed Stanley that: "It is not about Belgian colonies. It is about establishing a new state that is as large as possible and about its governance. It should be clear that in this project there can be no question of granting the Negroes the slightest form of political power. That would be ridiculous. The whites, who lead the posts, have all the power."

== Fate ==
Although the Committee had only replaced the International African Association in 1878, King Leopold II had the committee dissolved in 1879, and all the non-Belgian investors had their money returned. Stanley still believed he was working for the Committee for over a year afterwards. It was replaced by the International Association of the Congo, which was in turn replaced by the Congo Free State in 1885.

== See also ==
- Congo Reform Association
- Brussels Anti-Slavery Conference 1889–90
- Brussels Conference Act of 1890
