= International African Association =

Belgian royal front organization for the Colonization of the Congo

Flag of International African Association as well as the Congo Free State (1877–1908) and the Belgian Congo (1908–1960).

The International African Association (in full, "International Association for the Exploration and Civilization of Central Africa"; in French Association Internationale Africaine, and in full Association Internationale pour l'Exploration et la Civilisation de l'Afrique Centrale) was a front organization established by the guests at the Brussels Geographic Conference of 1876, an event hosted by King Leopold II of Belgium. The Association was used by King Leopold ostensibly to further his purportedly altruistic and humanitarian projects in the area of Central Africa, the area that was to become Leopold's privately controlled Congo Free State. King Leopold volunteered space in Brussels for the International African Association's headquarters, and there were to be national committees of the association set up in all the participating countries, as well as an international committee. Leopold was elected by acclamation as the international committee's first chairman, but said that he would serve for one year only so that the chairmanship could rotate among people from different countries.

The new body was welcomed throughout Europe (contributions were sent by the Rothschilds and Viscount Ferdinand de Lesseps) and the national committees were to be headed by grand dukes, princes, and other royals, but most of them never got off the ground. The international committee met once in the following year, reelected Leopold as chairman, despite his earlier pledge not to serve again, and then disintegrated. Nevertheless, thanks to the Association, Leopold succeeded in his goal of convincing the Belgian people and the major powers of Europe that his interest in Africa was purely altruistic and humanitarian-oriented. The Association was succeeded by the short-lived Committee for Studies of the Upper Congo, and the International Association of the Congo, which eventually dissolved when Leopold renamed the area the Congo Free State.

== History ==
=== Creation ===
The organization was created at the 1876 Brussels Geographic Conference to which Leopold invited nearly forty well-known experts, who were mainly schooled in the geographic sciences or were wealthy philanthropists. They hailed from a number of European countries. As a result, the Association was originally conceived as a multi-person, scientific, and humanitarian assembly but it quickly became dominated by Leopold and his economic interests in Africa. Originally, the stated goal of the group was to "discover" the largely unexplored Congo and "civilize" its natives, hence its full name: the "International Association for the Exploration and Civilization of Central Africa". In his novella Heart of Darkness, the author Joseph Conrad therefore sarcastically referred to the Association as "the International Society for the Suppression of Savage Customs". The Association was intended to be a joint effort on the parts of all European countries present at the Conference, however, each nation formed its own national committee for exploration which would, in theory, share information with the whole of the Association, hence, a cooperative effort. However, national economic interests quickly took precedence over the group's supposedly philanthropic ideals. Each of these committees organized nationalized expeditions into the African interior and there was very little sharing of information, resulting in each nation claiming certain portions of African land for themselves.

=== Exploration of the Region ===
From 1879 to 1884 famed explorer Henry Morton Stanley returned to the Congo, this time not as a reporter, but as an envoy from Leopold, and under the guise of the Belgian Committee, with the secret mission to organize a Congo state. At the same time, the French marine officer Pierre Savorgnan de Brazza traveled into the western Congo Basin and raised the French flag over the newly founded Brazzaville in 1881. The Kingdom of Portugal, which also claimed the area due to old treaties with the native Kongo Empire, made a treaty with Great Britain on February 26, 1884, to block off the Congo Society's access to the Atlantic.

At the same time, various European countries tried to acquire a foothold in Africa. France occupied Ottoman Tunisia and colonized today's Republic of the Congo in 1881, followed by the Rivières du Sud colony at the Gulf of Guinea in 1884. In 1882, Great Britain occupied the Khedivate of Egypt, an Ottoman vassal which ruled over much of present-day Sudan and parts of Somalia. In 1870 and 1882, Kingdom of Italy took possession of the first parts of Eritrea, while the German Empire declared Togoland, German Cameroon, and South-West Africa to be under its protection in 1884.

=== Disintegration ===
The large number of competing interests caused the Association to fracture and disintegrate over each member state's national interests. The Association's break-up eventually forced the Berlin Conference of 1884–1885, effectively beginning what became known as the Scramble for Africa. Despite the failure of the initial committee, the Belgian Committee that the Association generated continued to sponsor "humanitarian" missions into the bush.

=== Formation of the International Association of the Congo ===
In 1879, the International Association of the Congo was also formed, having more economic goals, but still closely related to the former society. Leopold secretly bought off the foreign investors in the Congo Society, which was turned to imperialistic goals, with the Association serving primarily as a philanthropic front. By these means, Leopold morphed the organization's "ideology from an international philanthropic association to that of a private commercial enterprise…[and] the change from a commercial plan to a political reality: the Congo Free State."

== See also ==
- International Association of the Congo
- Congo Reform Association
- List of boats used for exploration of the Congo
