= Joseph Everett Dutton =

British parasitologist

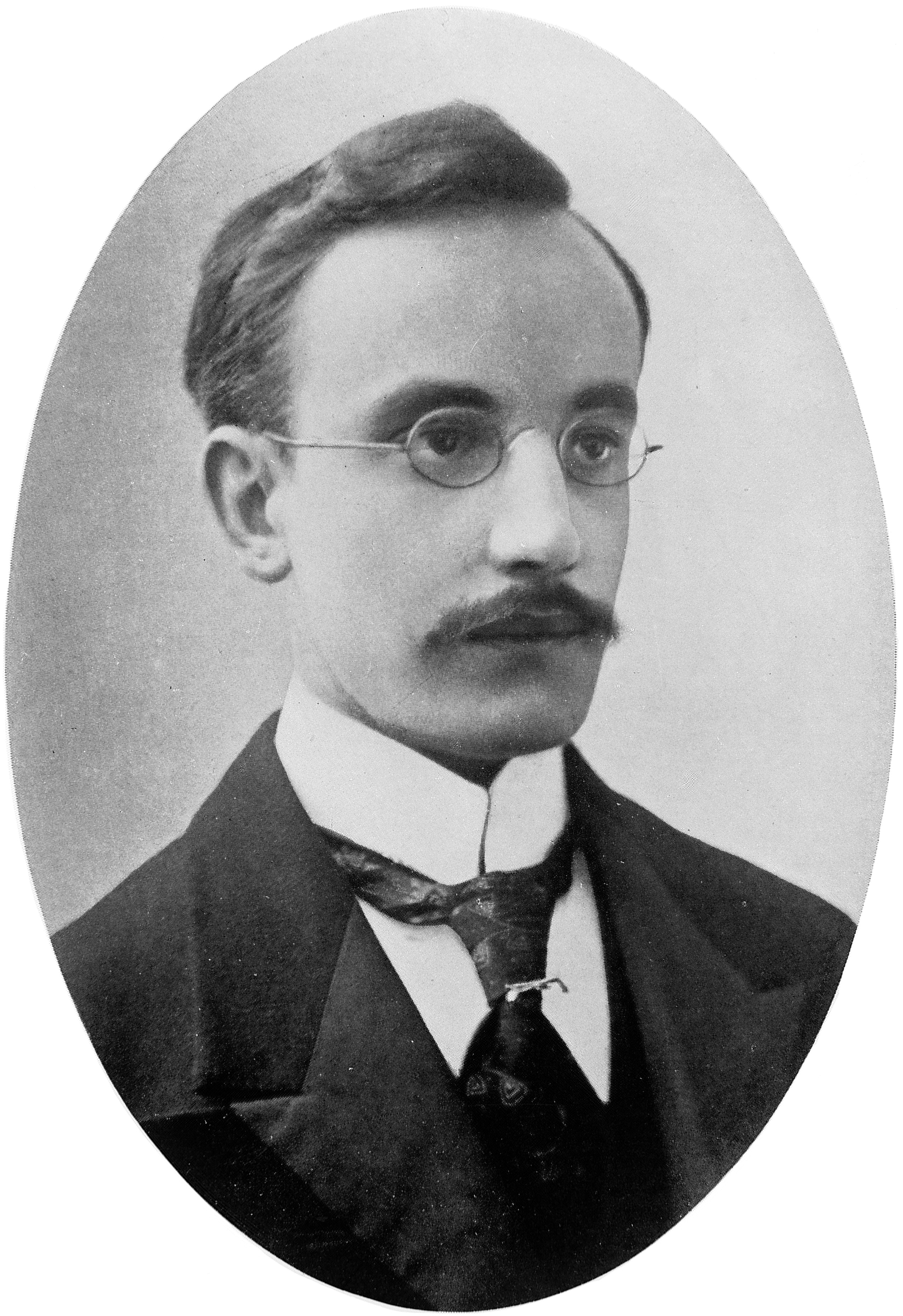
- Born: 9 September 1874; Upper Bebington, Cheshire, England
- Died: 27 February 1905 (aged 30); Kasongo, Congo
- Occupation: Parasitologist
- Known for: Discovery of the cause of sleeping sickness

Joseph Everett Dutton (9 September 1874 – 27 February 1905) was a British parasitologist who discovered one of the trypanosomes that cause sleeping sickness. He died in the Congo Free State at the age of 30 from tick fever, or African relapsing fever, while investigating the disease, which is caused by a spirillum that was later named Borrelia duttoni.

== Early years ==
Joseph Everett Dutton was born on 9 September 1874 in Upper Bebington, Cheshire. His father was John Dutton, a chemist, and his mother was Sarah Ellen Moore. He was their fifth son. He attended The King's School, Chester (January 1888 – May 1892).

He was admitted to the University of Liverpool in 1892, and earned the gold medal in anatomy and physiology, and the medal in materia medica in 1895. He won the medal in pathology at Victoria University in 1896. He graduated in 1897, and was appointed George Holt fellow in Pathology. He was appointed a resident at the Liverpool Royal Infirmary. He served as house surgeon under Professor Rushton Parker for six months, and then as house physician under Professor Richard Caton.

== West Africa ==
Dutton joined an expedition to Nigeria in 1900, the third expedition arranged by the Liverpool Medical School, with H.E. Annett and J.H. Elliott. This trip led to two reports, one on sanitation to avoid malaria and the other on filariasis. In 1901 he was elected Walter Myers Fellow in Parasitology.

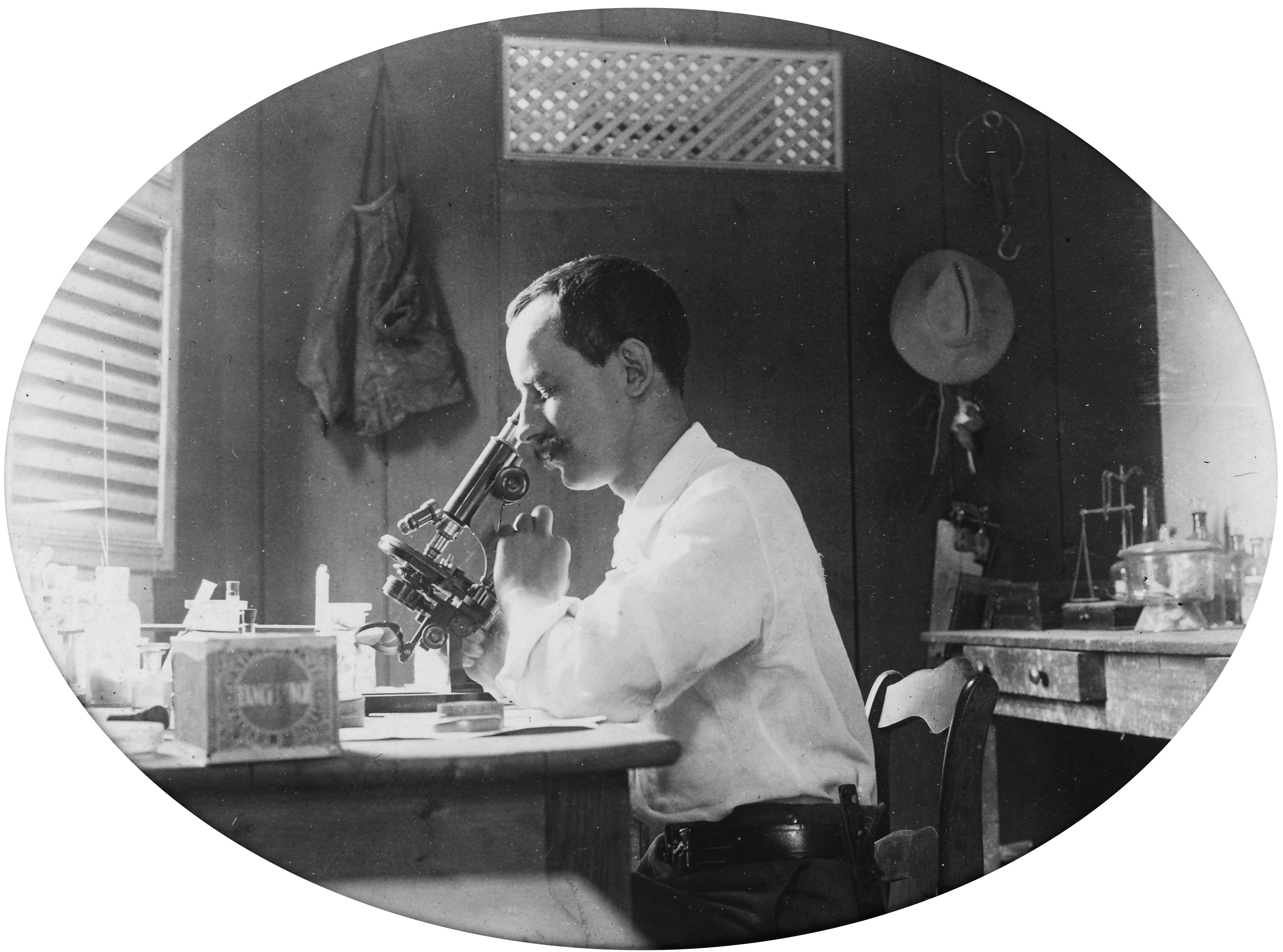
Joseph Dutton in Gambia in 1902–1903

Dutton undertook an expedition to the Gambia on his own at the start of 1901. He prepared a thorough report on methods of fighting malaria. On 10 May 1901 the colonial surgeon at the hospital in Bathurst showed him a blood sample from a government employee with "very many actively moving worm-like bodies whose nature he was unable to ascertain". The patient returned to England, and Dutton examined him again there, but could not detect any parasites. However, when both the patient and Dutton were back in Gambia on 15 December 1901, Dutton again examined blood samples and "found a flagellate protozoon evidently belonging to the genus Trypanosoma".

Trypanosoma brucei belongs to a family of parasites that so far had been found only in animal blood. The discovery was an important stage in understanding the widespread and often deadly disease of sleeping sickness. Dutton did not immediately draw the connection, since the patient was also suffering from malaria. Dutton also described various other trypanosomes. In September 1902 he returned to the Gambia with John Lancelot Todd, on an expedition which was supported by Joseph Chamberlain, Secretary of State for the Colonies, which facilitated a prolonged visit to French Senegal.

== Congo ==
The twelfth expedition of the Liverpool School of Tropical Medicine left for the Congo Free State on 13 September 1903. Dutton was accompanied by John Lancelot Todd and Cuthbert Christy. Christy went back to England in June 1904, while Todd and Dutton went upstream to Stanley Falls, which they reached late in 1904. There they demonstrated what caused tick fever, and how it was transferred between humans and monkeys. Dutton found that the monkeys could be infected by bites from soft ticks (Ornithodoros moubata) carrying Borrelia duttoni, a spirochaete. He also found that the parasite could pass into the eggs and larvae of the ticks, so the next generation would also be vehicles for infection.

Both Todd and Dutton caught the disease, but were well enough to continue traveling, and reached Kasongo on 9 February 1905. Dutton's health then declined quickly. He recorded his symptoms until too weak, after which Todd continued the record. Dutton died at Kasongo on 27 February 1905. More than a thousand people attended his burial, mostly local people whom he had treated and whose respect he had earned. It took two months for the news of his death to be carried to the nearest telegraph station.
