= Nsumbu =

Nsumbu Sumbu
- Town
- Interactive map of Nsumbu
- Location within Zambia
- Coordinates: 8°31′22″S 30°28′43″E
- Country: Zambia
- Province: Northern Province
- District: Nsama District
- Elevation: 775 m (2,543 ft)

Population
  - Total: 6,050
- Time zone: CAT
- UTC+2

Nsumbu, also called Sumbu, is a town in Nsama District of Northern Province of Zambia, named after a bay on the southwestern shore of Lake Tanganyika. It is on the northern side of Nsumbu National Park to which it gives its name. In 2022 the Nsumbu ward had a population of 6054, including the satellite villages Ndole, Kachese, Mwando, Kabulwe and Chaushi.

The main industries of Nsumbu are fishing, tourism and agriculture.

Since the 1990s the water level in Lake Tanganyka has risen by about 2 metres, flooding homes and structures along low-lying shores. This is particularly visible along the shoreline between the jetty and the mouth of the Chisala River, nearly 2 km to the northwest. Between 2018 and 2024 the water has penetrated part of the town up to 300 m from the 2018 shoreline.

== History ==
=== Tippu Tip and the coastal traders ===
In the 19th century, the area between Lakes Tanganyika and Mweru was inhabited by the Tabwa people. In the mid-19th century Nsumbu became a Swahili Arab settlement established by 'coastal traders' from Zanzibar and the Sultanate of Ujiji on the eastern shore of Lake Tanganyika. They traded in slaves, ivory, guns and cloth. From the 1860s until the 1890s Nsumbu was at the southernmost part of Tippu Tip's state and Tippu Tip himself was active in the hinterland of Nsumbu, sending slaves to Zanzibar and defeating Chief Nsama of the Tabwa people, who up until then had controlled the area between Lake Mweru and Lake Tanganyika. Trade routes went from the north of Lake Mweru around Lake Mweru Wantipa and through Nsumbu, then to Ujiji by sailing dhows, or around the south of Lake Tanganyka on foot. Nsumbu had links across the lake to other places in today's DR Congo, Burundi, and Tanzania.

=== David Livingstone and colonialism ===
In May 1867 the Scottish missionary explorer David Livingstone coming from the south arrived at the southern end of Lake Tanganyika and proceeded along the escarpment overlooking the lake's southwest shore. He came no closer than about 30 km from Nsumbu on 13th May 1867, near the mouth of the Lufubu, which he called the Lofu River. Getting news of the war between Tippu Tip and Chief Nsama to the west, Livingstone turned around and went back south, to Chief Chitimba's village (possibly today's Chitimbwa), to await safe passage to the other lake he had been told about — Lake Mweru. He waited in Chitimba three months, then under the protection of and with the help of a Swahili Arab called Hamees Wodim Tagh, he went westwards into Chief Nsama's Tabwa country, called Itawa, recording details of Tippu Tip's victory over Nsama, and meeting both of them on separate occasions, then eventually reaching Lake Mweru and Kazembe.

Livingstone's travels inspired both British missionaries of the London Missionary Society (LMS) and colonialists of the British South Africa Company (BSAC) to come to the Nsumbu area in the next few decades. In 1883 a site on the east bank of the Lufubu, about 40 km by boat from Nsumbu, was chosen by LMS missionaries Edward Hore and Alfred Swann as a temporary shipyard to assemble the SS Good News, a steamship to ferry preachers around the lake, launched in 1885. It is possible the first Europeans to visit Nsumbu were these or other LMS missionaries.

The first colonialist to visit Nsumbu was probably Alfred Sharpe of the BSAC in 1890, who found Headman Teleka in charge of the place he at first spelled as 'Sumbo'. Sharpe wrote:

" At Sumbo (or Msika) we were hospitably received by Bwana Teleka himself, and were reinforced by as many carriers as we required. Sumbo is a thriving settlement, and Teleka, a coast man, is subject to Tippoo Tib [sic]. There is frequent communication by dhows, between Njiji [Ujiji] and Sumbo."

In 1895 using a sailing boat from Kituta, a few kilometres east of Mpulungu, BSAC officers stationed at Abercorn established a boma at Nsumbu and stationed an officer there to help put an end to the slave trade and to take control of the territory, as the northern extremity of what became North Eastern Rhodesia in 1900. Teleka died in 1905 and his son succeeded him as headman, until he died in his turn in 1959 at the age of about 90. Nsumbu's Swahili Arab legacy continued for many more decades and this can still be detected in such things as the town's mosque and the existence of Swahili speakers.

In 1903 BSAC sold a few plots of land for commercial development including to the Africa Lakes Corporation. However the coastal traders continued to have a presence dealing in ivory, copper and cloth. They also indulged in the time-honoured activities of poaching and smuggling, with some of Teleka's people being convicted of such offences in 1913.

In 1904 Nsumbu became part of Mporokoso District, but in 1906 it came under Abercorn again, probably due to the ease of communication by boat from Kituta or Mpulungu. A large house was built near the jetty at Nsumbu with a view of the lake, for the use of visiting colonial officers.

In 1907 the town was evacuated due to an outbreak of sleeping sickness and was not fully reoccupied into 1912.

=== World War I ===
During World War I, colonial Belgian troops, as allies of the British against Germany, arrived at Nsumbu to make entrenchments against attack from German East Africa, and in 1914 these were shelled by one of the gunboats operating on the lake.

=== Post-World War II development ===
Sumbu Game Reserve (only the Sumbu name was used by the colonial administration) was created in the late 1940s and became a National Park in 1972. When the game reserve was created, Nsumbu was only connected to the rest of the country by bush paths, so it was only accessible by boat from Mpulungu.

The nearest road to Nsumbu only passed around the eastern end of Lake Mweru Wantipa, but in 1957 a gravel road was constructed to extend it to Nsumbu. This opened a new era for the town, with trucks bringing supplies, and transporting fish as far as the Copperbelt.

A road into the game reserve was not built until the mid-to late 1960s, after Kasaba Bay Lodge was opened, and the Kasaba Bay Airport was open to scheduled flights in the late 1960s. These ceased in the 1980s, and Kasaba Bay Airport was closed for redevelopment in the early 2000s, but this project has stalled. An alternative airstrip was made at Nkamba Bay Lodge, and then Chisala Airstrip opened closer to Nsumbu, and in May 2026 was the only one in the area in use.

== Infrastructure ==
Notable features and facilities in Nsumbu include:

- Kasaba Bay Primary School
- St Andrews Catholic School
- Kasaba Bay Boarding Secondary School
- Nsumbu Day Secondary school
- Nsumbu Trades Training Institute (ministry of Technology and Science)
- Nsumbu Rural Health Center (Nsumbu Mini Hospital)
- Nsumbu Harbour and jetty
- Nsumbu Modern Market
- Mpende Fisheries (fish farm)
- Department of National Parks and Wildlife Nsumbu office
- Nsumbu National Park Gate and headquarters
- Nsumbu Tanganyika Conservation Program
- Tanganyika Boat Unit
- Nsumbu Beach and hiking trail (within the National Park)
- Nsumbu Immigration Office
- Nsumbu Police Station

== Tourism ==
In the first two or three of decades of the park's existence (as Sumbu Game Reserve), tourist infrastructure was within the park at Kasaba Bay and Nkamba Bay, except for Mporokoso District Government Rest House chalets built on the low headland immediately east of the jetty. Since then an international-standard resort has been built north of the town at Ndole Bay, and several commercial lodges have been built in the town itself.

In May 2026, Kasaba Bay Lodge and Kasaba Bay Airport had been closed for two decades awaiting redevelopment.

== See also ==
- Nsama District
