= Stanley Falls =

Stanley Falls may refer to:

- Stanley Falls, Congo, former name for the Boyoma Falls, seven Congolese cataracts on the Lualaba River
- Stanley Falls District, the eastern part of the Congo Free State, later the Belgian Congo
- Two successive former Roman Catholic missionary jurisdictions in the Congo:
  - Apostolic Prefecture of Stanley Falls, which eventually became the Archdiocese of Kinshasa
  - Apostolic Vicariate of Stanley Falls, which became the Metropolitan Roman Catholic Archdiocese of Kisangani
