= Joseph Lippens =

19th-century Belgian military officer

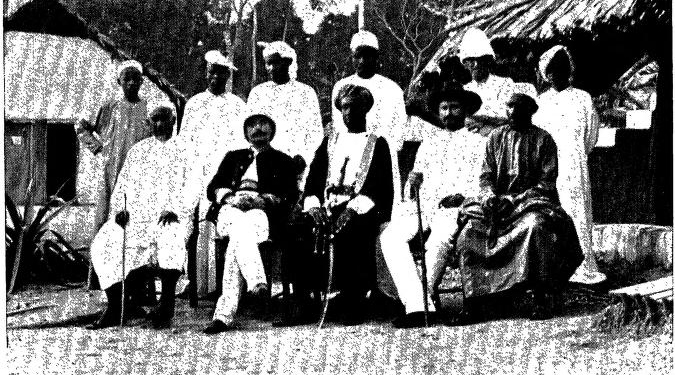
Joseph Lippens and Henri De Bruyne with Sefu bin Hamid, c. 1891.

Joseph François Lippens (Brussels, 10 October 1855 – Kasongo, 1 December 1892) was a Lieutenant in the Force Publique of the Congo Free State during the Congo Arab War. He was killed by the soldiers of Sefu bin Hamid.

== Events that led to his death ==
In early 1887, Henry Morton Stanley arrived in Zanzibar and proposed that Tippu Tip be made governor of the Stanley Falls District in the Congo Free State. Both Leopold II and Barghash bin Said agreed and on February 24, 1887, Tippu Tip accepted. Around 1890/91, Tippu Tip returned to Zanzibar where he retired. Sefu bin Hamid represented his father in the eastern Congo region of Kasongo and carried on the war in his stead.

=== Start of the Congo Arab War ===
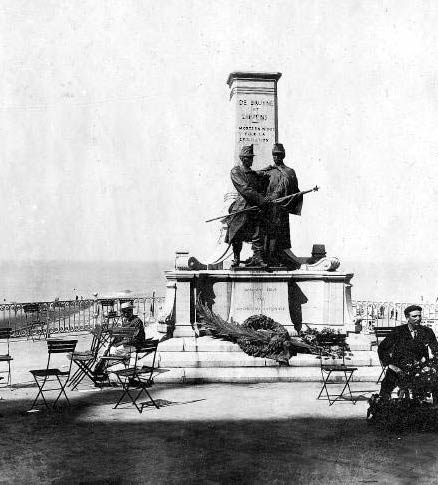
Monument of Lippens and De Bruyne, c. 1923

In 1892, after suffering an early defeat, Gongo Lutete betrayed Sefu bin Hamid and defected to the Force Publique. In response to this, Sefu put the Resident of Kasongo, Lieutenant Joseph Lippens, and his adjunct, Sergeant Henri De Bruyne, under house arrest. Sefu urged for a renegotiation of the borders of his territories and demanded Francis Dhanis to deliver him Gongo Lutete through a prisoner exchange. De Bruyne was escorted to Francis Dhanis on 15 November to inform him of Sefu's demands. Dhanis refused to agree to these terms and De Bruyne returned to Kasongo. This was considered by Sefu bin Hamid as an act of war.

Sefu crossed the Lomami River with 10,000 men—some 500 Zanzibari officers and the rest Congolese—and set up two forts on the Lomami River, where he was attacked on 26 November by the Force Publique and eventually was forced to retreat, after a battle which inflicted approximately 3000 casualties. In retaliation, Lippens and De Bruyne were killed in Kasongo, on the first of December, 1892. Their hands were cut off and De Bruyne was cut to pieces. After the capture of Kasongo 22 April 1893, the Force Publique discovered the graves of Lippens and De Bruyne. They also found the diaries of Emin Pasha, which indicated that he was killed on 23 October 1892.

== Commemoration ==
As a tribute to their service, Joseph Lippens and sergeant Henri De Bruyne, were commemorated by the erection of a monument on the boardwalk of Blankenberge, which was designed by the sculptor Guillaume Charlier.
