= Sefu bin Hamid =

19th-century Arab Zanzibari slave trader and state official

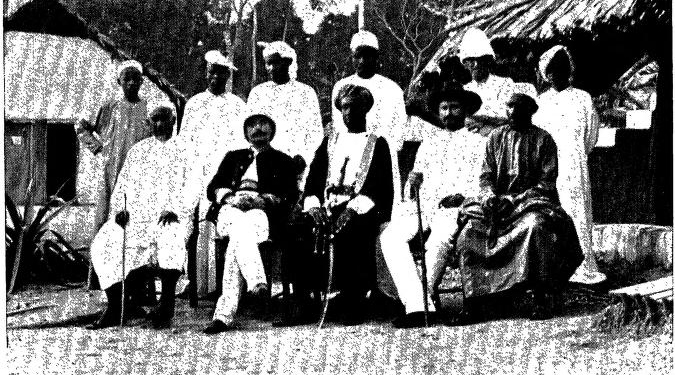
Sefu bin Hamid (center) with two Congo Free State officials of the Force Publique, Lieutenant Joseph Lippens and Sergeant Henri De Bruyne, at Stanley Falls, c. 1891

Sefu bin Hamid or Sayf bin Hamed (1850 – 20 October 1893) was an Arab Zanzibari slave trader and administrative official. The son of Tippu Tip, he was killed while fighting in the Congo Arab war.

== Governor of the Stanley Falls District ==
In early 1887, Henry Morton Stanley arrived in Zanzibar and proposed that Tippu Tip be made governor of the Stanley Falls District in the Congo Free State. Both Leopold II and Barghash bin Said agreed and on 24 February 1887, Tippu Tip accepted. Around 1890/1891, Tippu Tip returned to Zanzibar where he retired. Sefu bin Hamid represented his father in the eastern Congo region of Kasongo and carried on the war in his stead.

== Participation in the Congo Arab war ==
During March and April 1892, Sefu repeatedly attacked Congo Free State personnel in the eastern Congo, including ivory traders which ended up starting the Congo Arab war.

On 19 September 1892, after suffering an early defeat, Ngongo Lutete betrayed Sefu bin Hamid and defected to the Force Publique. In response to this, Sefu put the Resident of Kasongo, Lieutenant Joseph Lippens, and his adjunct, Sergeant Henri De Bruyne, under house arrest. Sefu urged for a renegotiation of the borders of his territories and demanded Francis Dhanis to deliver him Ngongo Lutete through a prisoner exchange. De Bruyne was escorted to Francis Dhanis on 15 November to inform him of Sefu's demands. Dhanis refused to agree to these terms and De Bruyne returned to Kasongo. This was considered by Sefu bin Hamid as an act of war.

Sefu crossed the Lomami River with 10,000 men—some 500 Zanzibari officers and the rest Congolese—and set up two forts on the Lomami River, where he was attacked by the Force Publique and eventually was forced to retreat. In retaliation, Lippens and De Bruyne were killed in Kasongo, on 1 December 1892. After the capture of Kasongo on 22 April 1893, the Force Publique discovered the graves of Lippens and De Bruyne, they also found the diaries of Emin Pasha, which indicated that he was killed on 23 October 1892.

The war's last major battle occurred on 20 October 1893, on the Luama River, west of Lake Tanganyika. It was a tactical stalemate, but eventually Sefu was defeated and was killed in action.

== Bibliography ==
- Edgerton, Robert B. (2002). The Troubled Heart of Africa: A History of the Congo. New York: St. Martin's Press. ISBN 0-312-30486-2.
- American Annual Cyclopedia and Register of Important Events, Volume 33. 1894.
- Hinde, Sidney Langford (1897). The Fall of the Congo Arabs.
