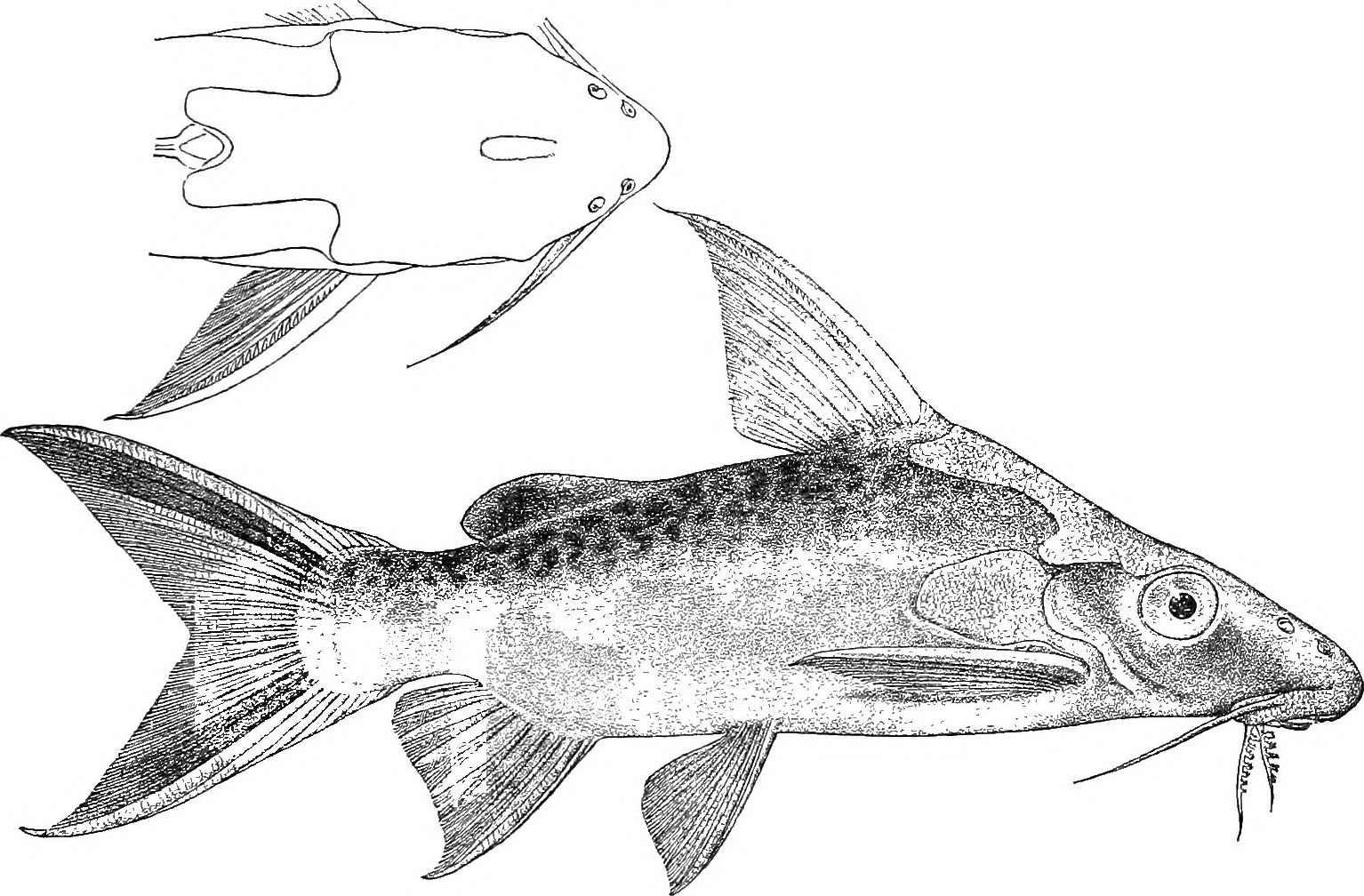

Conservation status
- Least Concern (IUCN 3.1)

Scientific classification
- Kingdom: Animalia
- Phylum: Chordata
- Class: Actinopterygii
- Order: Siluriformes
- Family: Mochokidae
- Genus: Synodontis
- Species: S. pleurops

Binomial name
- Synodontis pleurops Boulenger, 1897

= Synodontis pleurops =

Species of fish

Synodontis pleurops, known as the Congo squeaker, the bigeye squeaker, or the bug eyed synodontis, is a species of upside-down catfish native to the upper Congo Basin of Cameroon, the Democratic Republic of the Congo and the Republic of the Congo. It was first described by the Belgian-British zoologist George Albert Boulenger in 1899, based upon a holotype discovered at the Boyoma Falls, in the Democratic Republic of the Congo.

== Description ==
The body of the fish is brown and mottled, with brown edges on the caudal fin lobes. It is whitish on the underside. The species is noted for its large head and eyes. As individuals age the colors tend to fade somewhat.

Like other members of the genus, this fish has a humeral process, which is a bony spike that is attached to a hardened head cap on the fish and can be seen extending beyond the gill opening. The first ray of the dorsal fin and the pectoral fins have a hardened first ray which is smooth in the front and serrated on the back, a little shorter than the head. The caudal fin is deeply forked. It has short, cone-shaped teeth in the upper jaw. In the lower jaw, the teeth are s-shaped and movable. The fish has one pair of long maxillary barbels, extending far beyond the operculum, and two pairs of mandibular barbels that are often branched. The adipose fin is small, 2 to 3 times as long as deep. The anal fin is pointed.

This species grows to a length of 23 centimetres (9.1 in) SL although specimens up to 32.5 centimetres (12.8 in) TL have been recorded in the wild.

== Habitat ==
In the wild, the species inhabits tropical waters with a temperature range of 22 to 26 °C (72 to 79 °F), a pH of 6.0 – 7.0, and dH range of up to 10. It has been found throughout the Congo River basin, with the exception of the Luapula River system.
