= Lubao (disambiguation) =

Lubao is a 1st class municipality in the province of Pampanga, Philippines.

Lubao may also refer to:

- Lubao, Democratic Republic of the Congo
- Lubao, Foshan, a town in Sanshui county, Guangdong province, China
