= Borrelia duttoni =

Scientific classification
- Domain: Bacteria
- Kingdom: Pseudomonadati
- Phylum: Spirochaetota
- Class: Spirochaetia
- Order: Spirochaetales
- Family: Borreliaceae
- Genus: Borrelia
- Species: B. duttoni

Binomial name
- Borrelia duttoni (Novy and Knapp 1906) Bergey et al. 1925 (Approved Lists 1980)

Species of bacterium

Borrelia duttoni (formerly known as Spirochaeta duttoni) is a species of Borrelia. It is the endemic causative agent of tick-borne relapsing fever in parts of sub-Saharan Africa, and Madagascar. It is transmitted by the soft-bodied tick Ornithodoros moubata which sheds the pathogen in its saliva and coxal fluid. Vertical transmission occurs in ticks which thus appear to represent the major reservoir of this pathogen. Humans appear to be the sole vertebrate host of B. duttoni, although chickens and pigs may be infected according to research performed in East Africa. Human disease is characterised by a long incubation period, numerous brief recurrences, and frequent ocular involvement. Infection results immunity which is enduring but strain-specific.

It is named after Joseph Everett Dutton, who died of the disease in 1905 while he and John Lancelot Todd were investigating "tick fever".
