= Goma people =

Ethnic group from Kigoma Region of Tanzania

The Goma (Swahili: Wagoma, Kigoma: Bahoma, Mbembe: Bakyobha), who also refer to themselves as Al ghamawiyyun in Arabic, are a tribe in the Kigoma Region in western Tanzania. They are a contingent of the Bantu tribe and subgroup of Manyema who are more commonly found in Tanzania. The remnants minority clans are also found in Democratic Republic of Congo with the former migrated from the western shore of the Lake Tanganyika in Democratic Republic of Congo. They are the first group of the Bantu tribe to ever cross the Lake Tanganyika and also the first group to reside in the Urban District of Kigoma as its inhabitants. Following the Wagoma were Niakaramba (Kwalumona) from Cape Karamba and then Wabwari from Ubwari peninsula. The Kwalumona merged within Wabwari, identified themselves as Bwaris and settled north of Wagoma in Kigoma before resettling in Ujiji and its environs, where they are part of wider ethnicity in Ujiji known as Wamanyema. The Wagoma crossed the lake early due to their invention of dug-out canoes mitumbwi ya mti mmoja curved from Mivule trees of Ugoma mountains from western shore of the Lake.

== History ==
In Goma history the villages and hamlets were many before the emigration and wars and the traditional states comprised several number of them before the immigration of bembe people with significant numbers of chiefdoms or sultanates sometimes under the suzerainty of Uguhha Kingdom the southernmost goma state under the Bakwamamba Dynasty in modern Kalemie in Tanganyika district of Katanga Region in Democratic Republic of Congo.

== Political Organization ==
Politically Bahoma arrived in north-western shores of Lake Tanganyika in D.R.C with their centralized political institutions that had based on the recognition of autonomous rulers of their village groups with both temporal and spiritual powers vested on single individuals who had the power of life and death over their subjects. The traditional title of Bahoma Sultans and other related tribes is Kolo.

== Religion and Culture ==
About all Goma people are Muslims due to the influence of Arabs and their hegemony around the Tanganyika lakist communities.

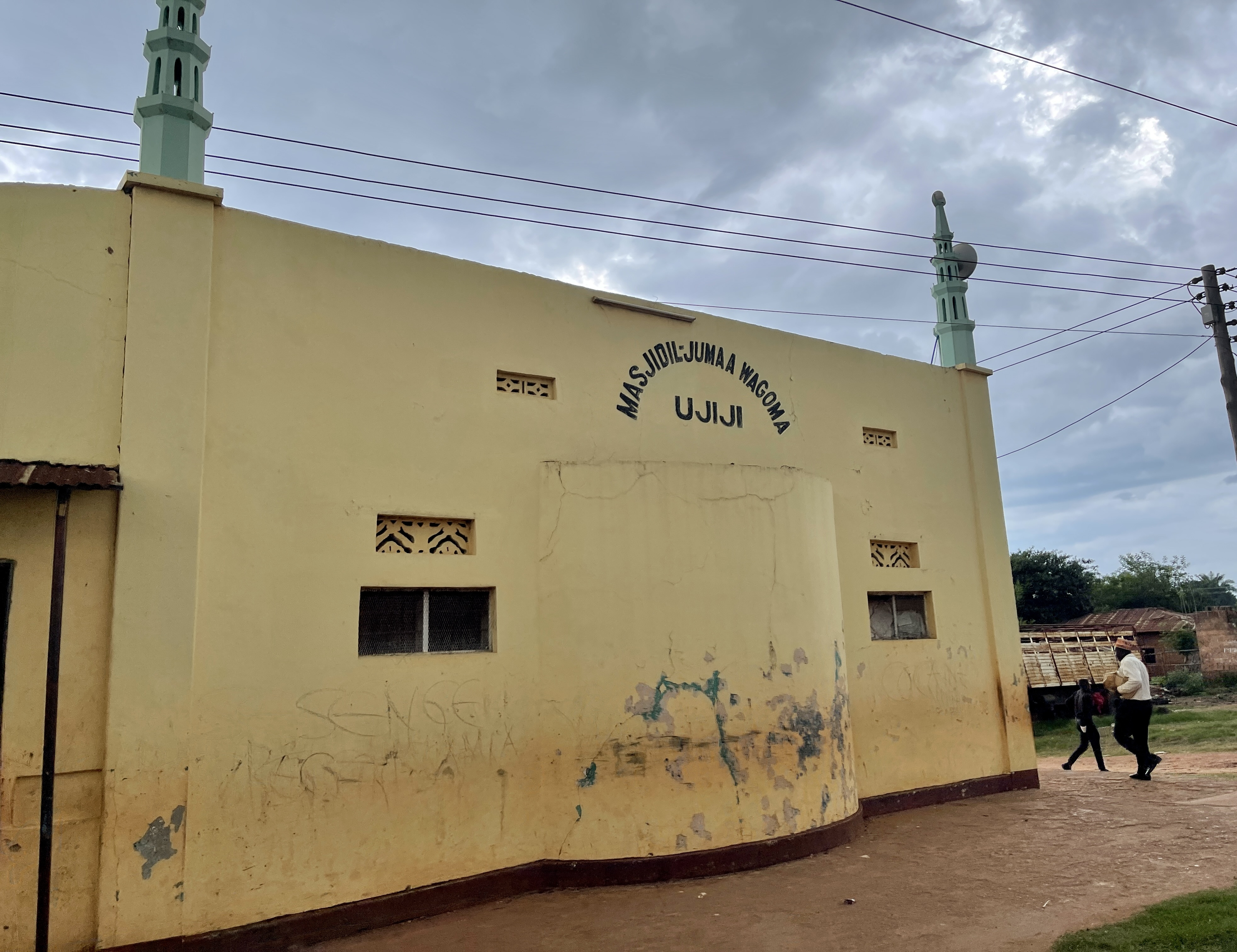
Wagoma community mosque at Kitongoni ward, Ujiji town.

In Tanzania prior and during colonialism the Gomas were politically included with other Manyemas mainly by indirect rule under the local authority of the Arab-Swahili Liwalis of Ujiji with local representatives to the town council with their old dynasties being disregarded and remained active ritually within their respective clans. Until recently in 2017 that the old Bene Mbonwe dynasty was restored at Ujiji by its senior members of the royal clan in Agnatic succession as the Mwene Mbonwean Sultanate of Ujiji and became the first Goma and Manyema traditional authority to have Ujiji as its royal seat.

== Sources ==
- Burton, Richard F. (1860). The Lake Regions of Central Africa: A Picture of Exploration, Volume 1. Harper & Brothers Publishers: New York.
- Kigoma Development Association (Tanzania) (1994). The Baha and the related peoples of the Kigoma region.
