= John Lancelot Todd =

Canadian physician and parasitologist

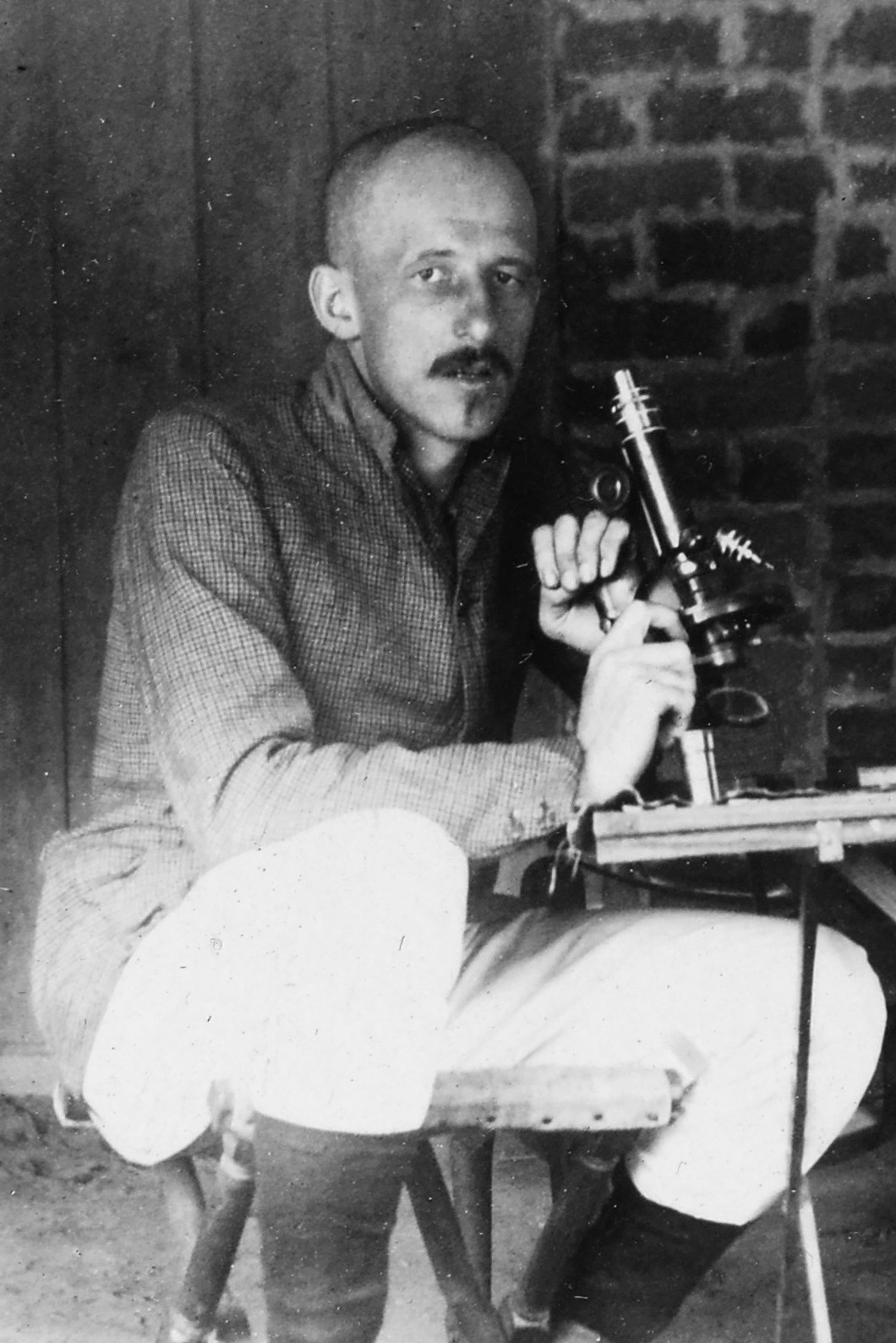
- John Lancelot Todd in Congo in 1905
- Born: 10 September 1876; Victoria, British Columbia, Canada
- Died: 27 August 1949 (aged 72); Sainte-Anne-de-Bellevue, Quebec, Canada
- Occupation: Physician
- Known for: Parasitology

John Lancelot Todd (10 September 1876 – 27 August 1949) was a Canadian physician and parasitologist.

== Early years ==
John Lancelot Todd was born on 10 September 1876 in Victoria, British Columbia. He was of Anglo-Irish origins. His father was Jacob Hunter Todd, a prosperous businessman, and his mother was Rosanna Wigley, a teacher. He attended Upper Canada College, where one of his teachers was the author Stephen Leacock. In 1894 he was admitted to McGill University. He gained a B.A. in 1898 and a medical degree in 1900. He then spent some time in laboratory work, examining bacteriological and pathological specimens at the Royal Victoria Hospital.

== African expeditions ==
In 1901 Todd was admitted to the Liverpool School of Tropical Medicine (LSTM). In 1902 he went on an LSTM expedition to The Gambia and Senegal, with Joseph Everett Dutton. The expedition was supported by Joseph Chamberlain, Secretary of State for the Colonies, which facilitated the stay in Dakar, in the French colony. The two men left Liverpool on 21 August 1902, and established themselves at Cape St. Mary, near Bathurst, where they treated patients and conducted research, working long hours. Once they dissected a horse that had been killed by trypanosomiasis. They studied diseases related to trypanosoma, and investigated sanitation in the main population centers.

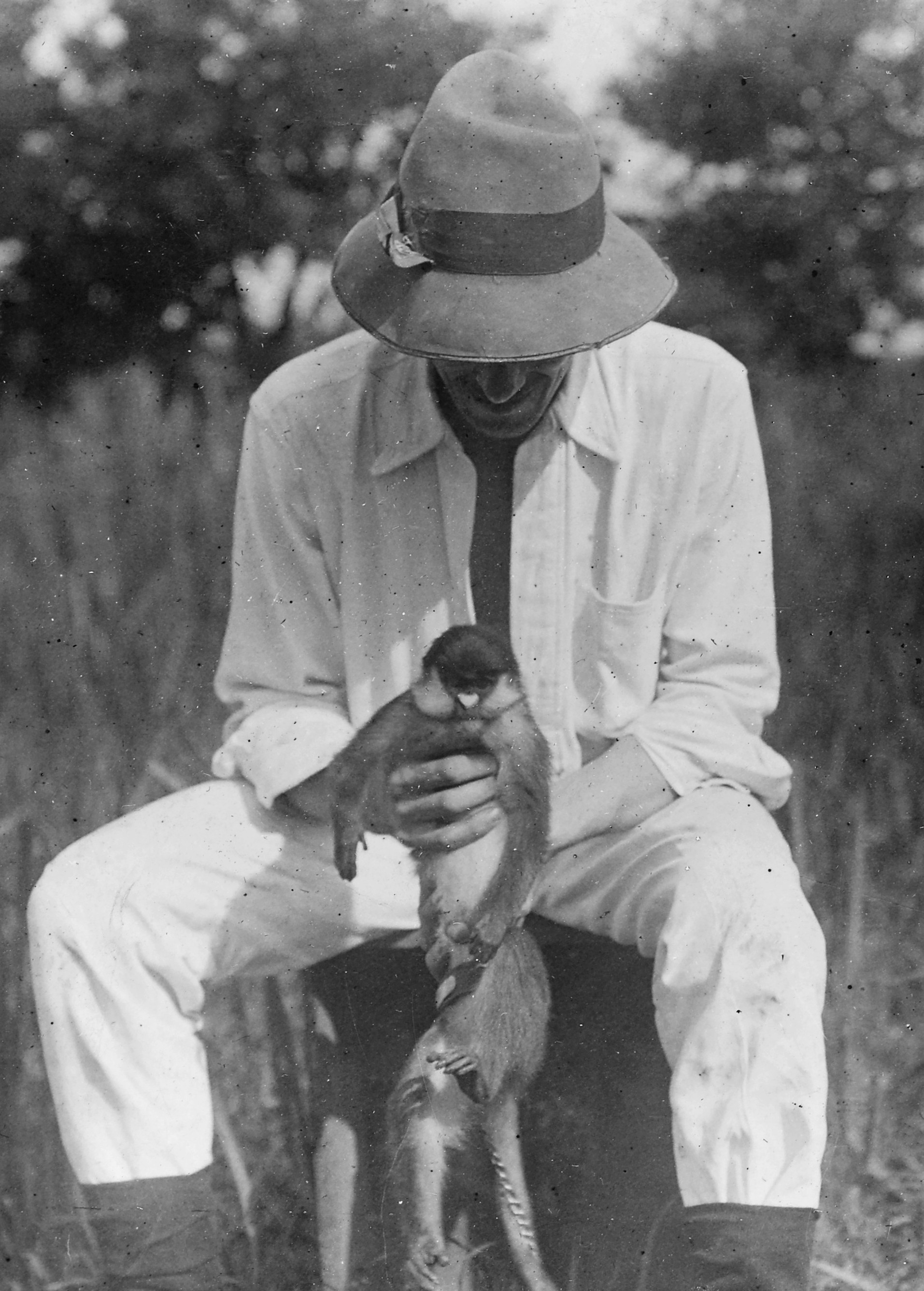
John Lancelot Todd with a monkey used in experiments in the Congo expedition 1903–05

In 1903 Todd and Dutton accepted an invitation by King Leopold II of Belgium to research the connection between trypanosoma and sleeping sickness in the Congo Free State. The twelfth expedition of the Liverpool School of Tropical Medicine left for the Congo Free State on 13 September 1903. Dutton and Todd were accompanied Cuthbert Christy. Christy went back to England in June 1904, while Todd and Dutton went upstream to Stanley Falls, which they reached late in 1904. There they demonstrated what caused tick fever, and how it was transferred between humans and monkeys. Both Todd and Dutton caught the disease, but were well enough to continue traveling, and reached Kasongo on 9 February 1905. Dutton's health then declined quickly. He recorded his symptoms until too weak, after which Todd continued the record. Dutton died at Kasongo on 27 February 1905. Todd completed the program of study in respect for Dutton's memory. He left the Congo to return to England via Tanganyika in April 1905.

The LSTM appointed Todd an assistant lecturer on his return, and in 1906 appointed him director of tropical diseases at the Runcorn Research Centre. Todd and two other scientists from the LSTM, Rupert Boyce and Ronald Ross, were invited to meet King Leopold II in August 1906. Todd said of this visit, "After we'd finished telling the old man how to make the Congo healthy and promised to administer a lovely coat of whitewash to his character in the eyes of the English, he created Boyce, Ross and myself officers of his Order of Leopold II..." In 1907 Todd accepted the position of Associate Professor of Parasitology at McGill. He established a laboratory in Sainte-Anne-de-Bellevue, Quebec, at Macdonald College. Todd left on another LSTM expedition to conduct further studies of trypanosomes in the Gambia in January 1911. He was accompanied by Simeon Burt Wolbach of Harvard University.

== Later career ==
Todd married Marjory Clouston (1882–1945) on 20 December 1911. She was the daughter of Edward Clouston, General Manager of the Bank of Montreal. They settled on a farm in Senneville, Quebec, and were to have three daughters. During World War I Todd served in the Canadian Army Medical Corps. From 1916 to 1919 he was Canadian Pension Commissioner, and had lasting influence on the way in which Canadian pensions are administered. After the war he led an expedition for the American Red Cross to find a way to contain a violent outbreak of typhus in eastern Europe. Todd resigned from McGill in 1925, partly due to poor health and partly to administrative disputes. He worked for Canada's National Research Council, setting up the Institute of Parasitology at Macdonald College in 1932.

From 1934 to 1939 Todd and his family lived in England. With the outbreak of World War II they returned to farming in Senneville. Marjory Todd died in February 1945. John Lancelot Todd died on 27 August 1949 in a car accident in Sainte Anne de Bellevue, a few miles from home.

== Bibliography ==
- Dutton, Joseph Everett; Todd, John Launcelot (1903). First Report of the Trypanosomiasis Expedition to Senegambia (1902) of the Liverpool School of Tropical Medicine and Medical Parasitology. Published for University Press of Liverpool.
- Dutton, Joseph Everett; Todd, John Lancelot; Christy, Cuthbert; Harold Wolferstan Thomas; Ernest Edward Austen (1904). Reports of the Trypanosomiasis Expedition to the Congo 1903–1904 of the Liverpool School of Tropical Medicine and Medical Parasitology. Williams & Norgate for the University Press of Liverpool.
- Dutton, Joseph Everett; Todd, John Lancelot; Tobey, Edward Nelson (1907). Concerning Certain Parasitic Protozoa Observed in Africa: Being the Eighth Interim Report of the Expedition of the Liverpool School of Tropical Medicine to the Congo, 1903-5. University Press.
- Moore, Benjamin; Nierenstein, Maximilian; Todd, John Lancelot (1908). Concerning the Treatment of Experimental Trypanosomiasis. At the University Press.
- Todd, John Lancelot (1911). The Duration of Trypanosome Infections. American Medical Association.
- Todd, John Lancelot (1912). Parasitic Protozoa from the Gambia: Second Report of the Expedition of the Liverpool School of Tropical Medicine to the Gambia, 1911.
- Todd, John Lancelot; Wolbach, Simeon Burt (1911). The Diagnosis and Distribution of Human Trypanosomiasis in the Colony and Protectorate of Gambia. At the University Press.
- Todd, John Lancelot (1916). A Report on how France Returns Her Soldiers to Civilian Life.
