= Stanley Falls District =

- District
- Location within Democratic Republic of the Congo
- Coordinates: 0.516667°N 25.2°E
- Country: Belgian Congo
- Province: Orientale, Katanga
- District: Stanley Falls

Stanley Falls District (French: District des Stanley Falls, Dutch: District Stanley Falls) was a district of the Congo Free State. It covered most of the eastern part of the colony along the Congo River south from Stanleyville (present-day Kisangani).

== Location ==
The explorer Henry Morton Stanley visited the area in 1883, and established a station that became the city of Kisangani below the Boyoma Falls, a 56 miles (90 km) series of cataracts. The river was navigable from Léopoldville up to this point. The station was known first as Falls Station and then as Stanleyville, and the falls were known as Stanley Falls.

A decree of 3 September 1886 by the Congo Free State administrator general Camille Janssen defined nine districts in the Free State, each headed by a district commissioner, including Stanley Falls District. Article 3 of the decree of 16 April 1887 provided for the Congo Free State to be divided into administrative districts headed by district commissioners, assisted by one or more deputies. The decree of 1 August 1888 divided the Congo Free State into eleven districts including Stanley Falls District with capital at Stanley Falls.

An 1897 map of the Congo Free State showed the huge Stanley Falls District where the later Stanleyville and Katanga districts would be created. It covered an area of about 270,000 square miles (700,000 km^{2}). It was bounded by Uellé District to the northeast and Aruwimi District to the northwest, then by Lualaba Kassai District to the southwest. To the south and east it was bordered by English and German possessions.

The district covered almost the whole Congo Basin south of the Stanley Falls. The boundary with Aruwimi District was defined by the Lomami River. From north to south, the eastern border included Lake Albert Nyassa, Lake Albert-Edward, Lake Tanganyika, Lake Moero and Lake Bangwelo. Later, Lake Bangweulu was determined to be within Northern Rhodesia. Lake Kivu was shown as contained within the district, although later it was found to be on the border between Rwanda and the Belgian Congo.

A 1910 map of the Belgian Congo shows the districts after Stanley Falls District had been separated into Stanleyville District to the north and the vice-government general of Katanga to the south, with the Lualaba portion of Lualaba Kassai District transferred to Katanga. The reorganization had been done that year.

== History ==
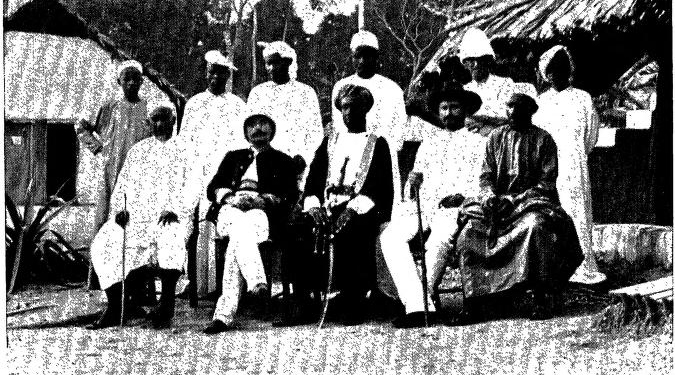
Sefu bin Hamid (center) with two officials of the Force Publique, Lieutenant Joseph Lippens and Sergeant Henri De Bruyne, at Stanley Falls, c. 1891

In February 1887 Henry Morton Stanley arrived in Zanzibar. There he met Tippu Tip, his former opponent and head of a great trading empire in the eastern Congo region. Stanley told him Leopold II of Belgium wanted to make peace with the Arabs, and offered Tippu Tip the position of governor of Stanley Falls District (the king had approved this offer by telegram, but it originated with Stanley). Tippoo Tib accepted the offer, which gave a monthly salary of £30. He promised to raise the Belgian flag and to restrain his fellow Arabs from slaving and other depredations. A European officer would be attached to him, and would make regular reports to the Belgian king. King Leopold II collaborated with the Arabs at first, but disagreements arose over control of ivory and compliance with Leopold II's pledges to the Berlin Conference to end slavery. Leopold II's stance turned confrontational against his once-allies.

The Congo–Arab War took place between the forces of King Leopold II of Belgium's Congo Free State and various Zanzibari Arab slave traders led by Sefu bin Hamid, the son of Tippu Tip. Fighting occurred in the eastern Congo between 1892 and 1894. It was a proxy war, with most of the fighting being done by native Congolese, who aligned themselves with either side and sometimes switched sides. The causes of the war were largely economic based, since Leopold and the Arabs were contending to gain control of the wealth of the Congo. In 1893 Louis-Napoléon Chaltin reached the Stanley Falls station (now Kisangani) when it was on the point of falling to the Swahilis. He defeated the Arab-led forces on 18 May 1893. After defeating them again at Kirundu, the Arabs were expelled from the region. The war ended in January 1894 with a victory of Leopold's Force Publique.

On 15 July 1898 the Stanley Falls District became the Orientale Province, with Stanleyville as its headquarters. The Apostolic Prefecture of Stanley Falls was created on 3 August 1904 out of territory taken from the Apostolic Vicariate of Congo Belge.

== Maps ==
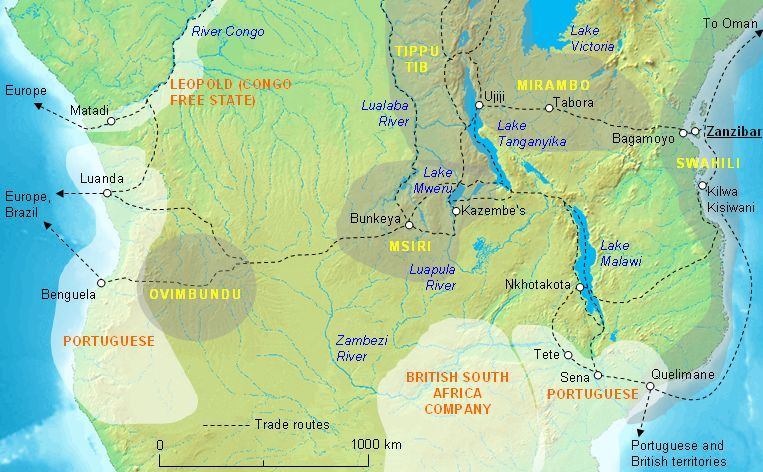
Central Africa in 1880

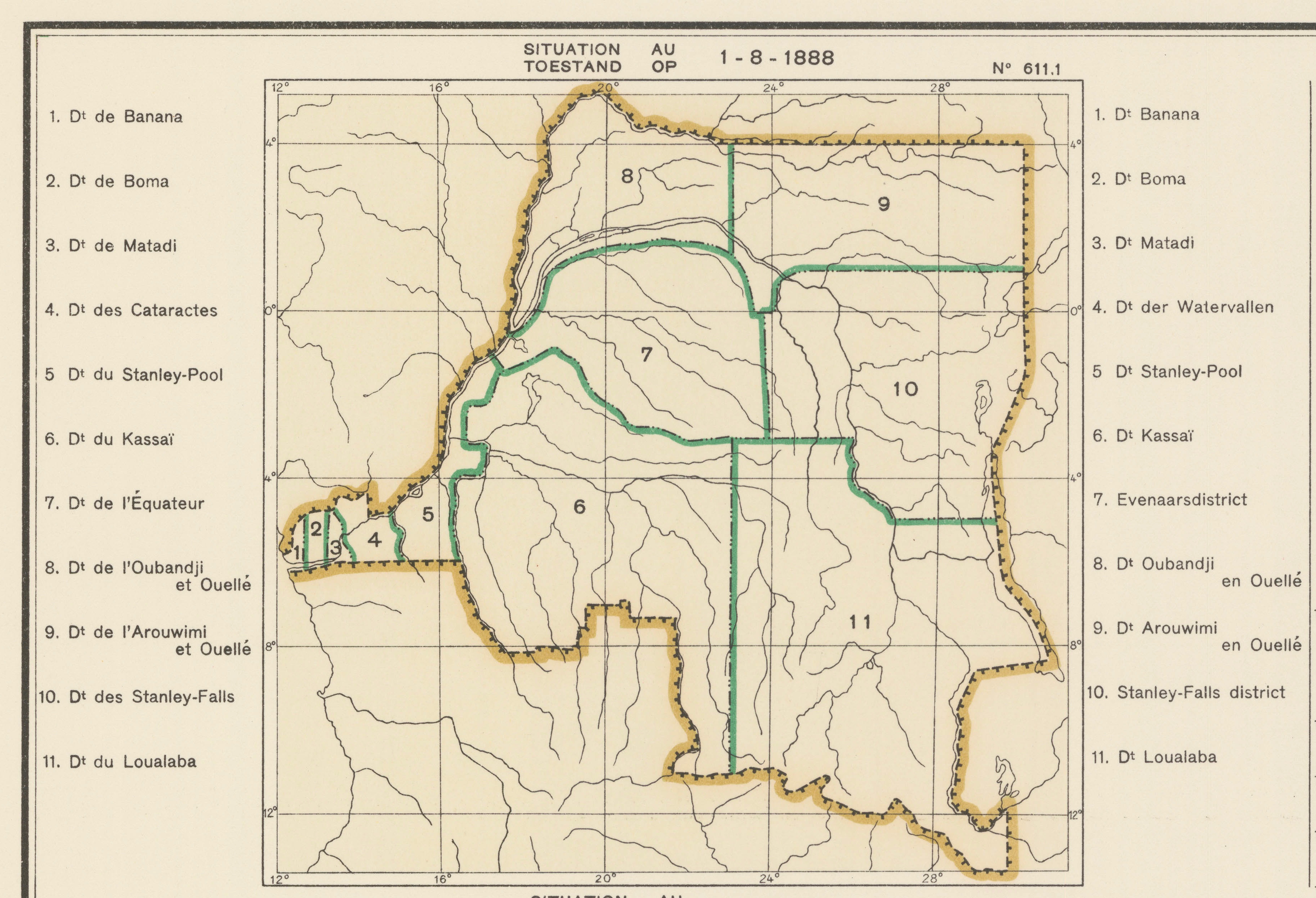
Districts of the Congo Free State in 1888. Lualaba separated from Stanley Falls

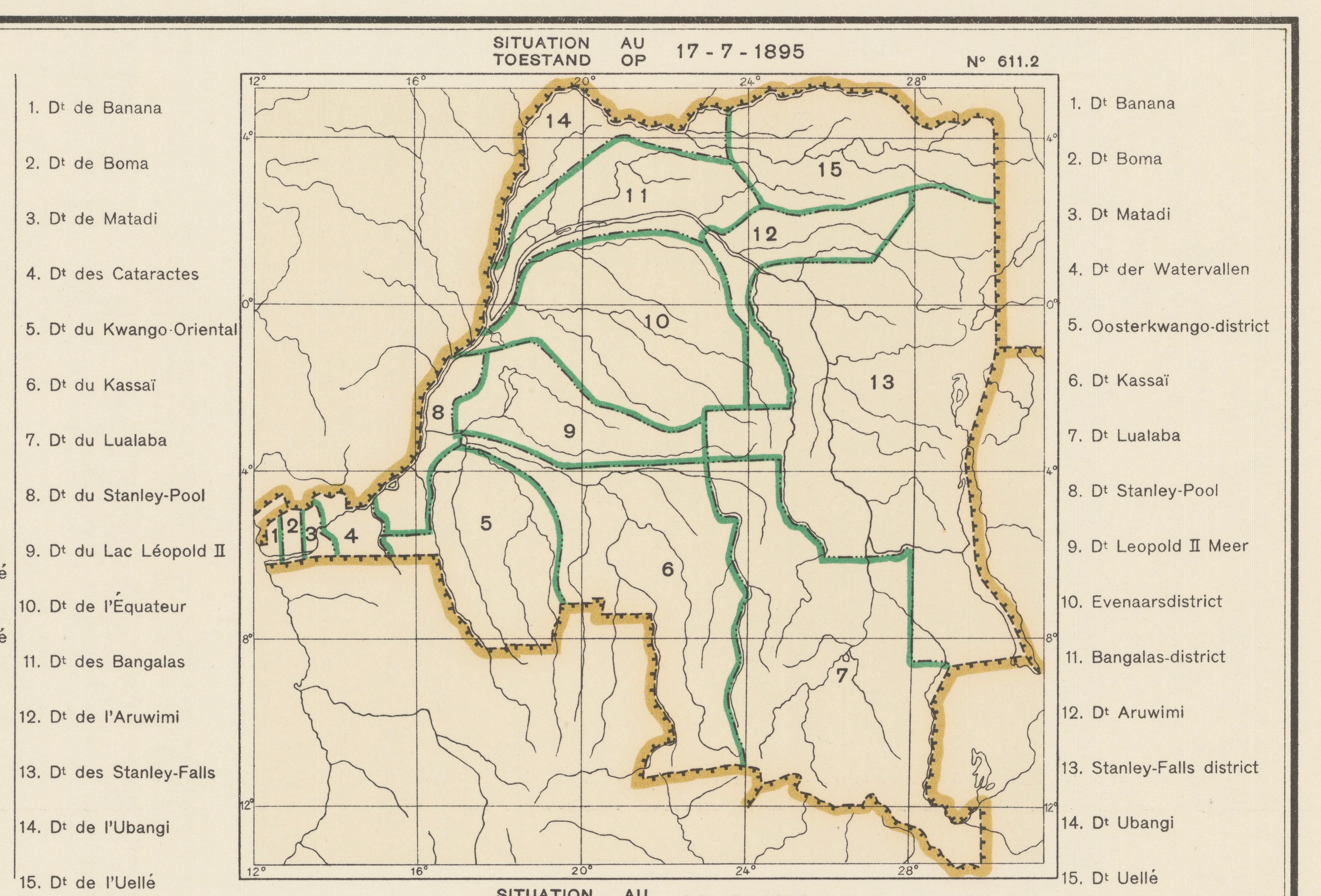
Districts of the Congo Free State in 1895. Lualaba separated from Stanley Falls

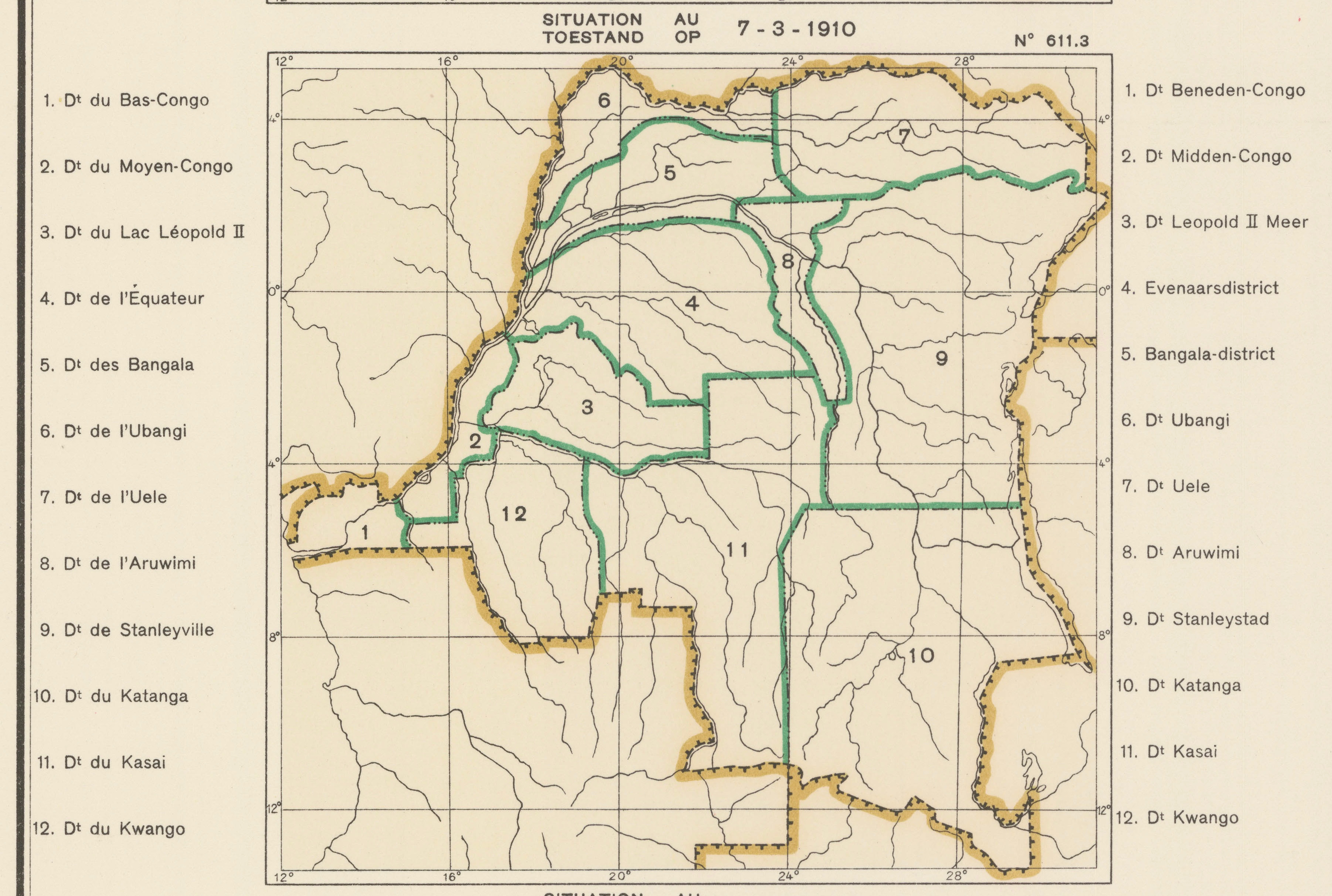
1910 provinces and districts. Lualaba and south part of Stanley Falls replaced by Katanga

== See also ==
- Districts of the Congo Free State
- Districts of the Belgian Congo

== Sources ==
- Atlas général du Congo / Algemene atlas van Congo (in French and Dutch), Belgium: Institut Royal Colonial Belge, 1948–1963, OCLC 681334449 / http://www.kaowarsom.be/en/online_maps
- Auzias, Dominique; Labourdette, Jean-Paul (2006). Congo: république démocratique. Petit Futé. ISBN 2-7469-1412-3.
- Brode, Heinrich (1907), Tippoo Tib, the story of his career in Central Africa, Havelock, H., translator, London: Arnold
- Edgerton, Robert (2002), The Troubled Heart of Africa: A History of the Congo, St. Martin's Press, ISBN 0-312-30486-2
- Etat Indépendant du Congo (1886), Bulletin Officiel (PDF)
- "Kisangani", Britannica, britannica.com, USA, archived from the original on 2019-03-27
- Lemarchand, René (1964), Political Awakening in the Belgian Congo, University of California Press, GGKEY:TQ2J84FWCXN
- Metropolitan Archdiocese of Kinshasa, GCatholic.org
- Ndaywel è Nziem, Isidore (1998). Histoire generale du Congo. De Boeck Supérieur. ISBN 2-8011-1174-0.
- Nzongola-Ntalaja, Georges (3 May 2002), The Congo: From Leopold to Kabila: A People's History, Zed Books, ISBN 978-1-84277-053-5
- Omasombo Tshonda, Jean (2014), Bas-Uele, Musée royal de l’Afrique centrale, ISBN 978-9-4916-1586-3
- Omasombo Tshonda, Jean (2015), Mongala : Jonction des territoires et bastion d'une identité supra-ethnique (PDF), Musée royal de l’Afrique centrale, ISBN 978-9-4922-4416-1
