= Manyema =

Ethnic group from Kigoma Region of Tanzania and eastern DRC

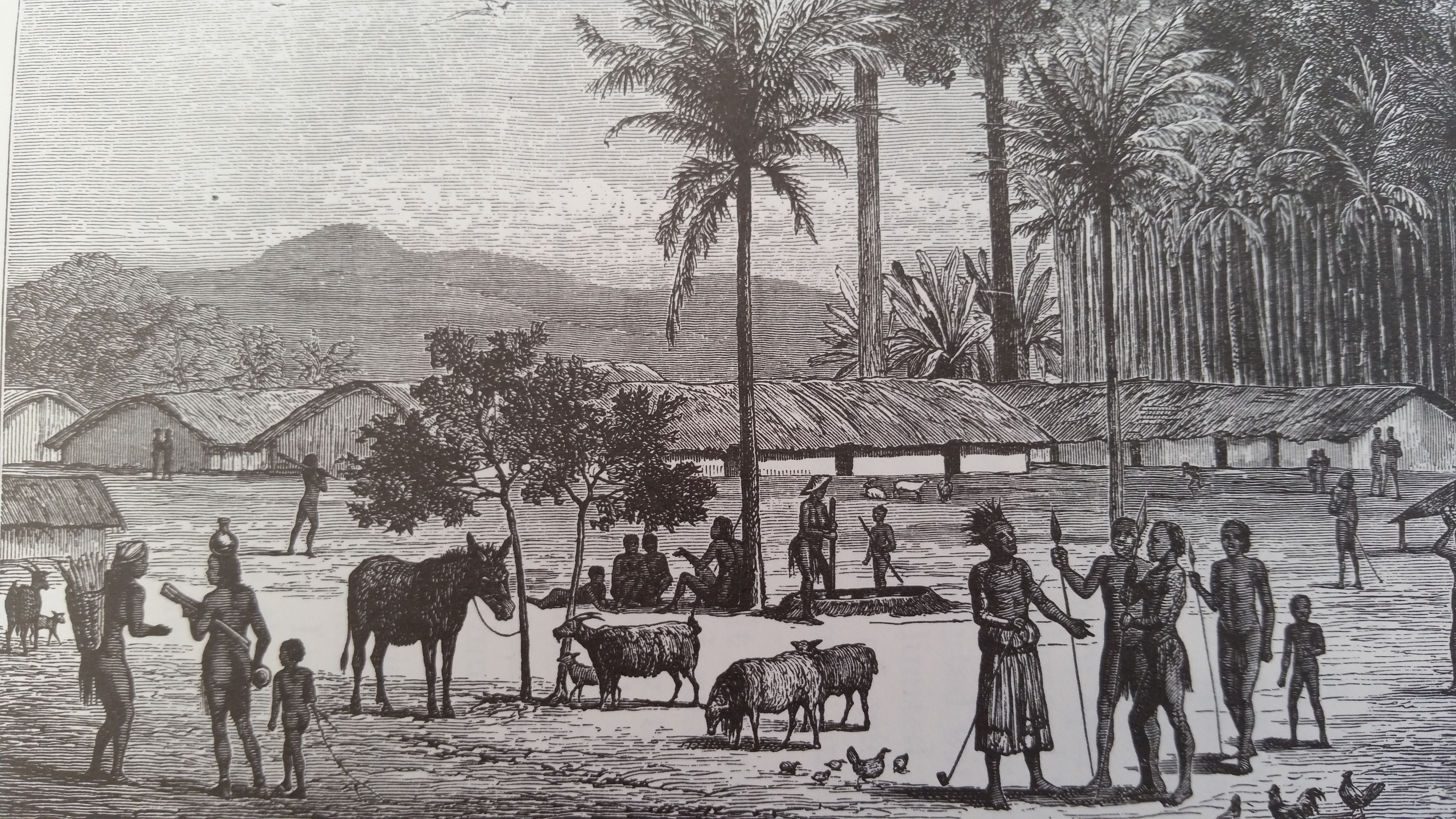
Manyema settlement in 1876

Manyema (WaManyema) (Una-Ma-Nyema, eaters of flesh) are a Bantu ethnic group, described in the past as powerful and warlike, in the African Great Lakes region of Eastern Africa and Central Africa. The Manyema are Muslim and religiously influential in the region.

Many Manyema, like many Nyamwezi, are the descendants of porters who emerged during the height of the Swahili-Arab trade in the Sultanate of Utetera. For much of the 19th century, their territory was regarded as an 'El Dorado' of Arab slave raiders. Over time, the area was extensively incorporated into Swahili economy and culture.

Verney Lovett Cameron noted that "very few slaves are exported from Manyuema by the Arabs (a misnomer often applied to the Swahili) for profit, but are obtained to fill their harems, to cultivate the farms which always surround the permanent camps, and to act as porters." The New York Times reported that the Manyema "allied themselves with the Arabs".

During the early to mid-1800s, many Manyema traversed, back and forth, across Lake Tanganyika towards the Swahili coast in larger numbers as caravan porters, merchants, mercenaries, war refugees (emphasised in Manyema memories), slaves (emphasised by missionaries and colonial officials), and to some extent as slave traders (emphasised by explorers like Henry Morton Stanley, David Livingstone and John Speke).

A Manyema man would typically have children who are also identified as Manyema from birth. Similarly, children of Arab men would be identified as Arab. However, a female Manyema would often give birth to a child of various ethnicities, such as Swahili, Zaramo, Shihiri, or Arab. Thus, she may have multiple children, each with a different ethnicity that differs from her own.

Sarah K. Croucher states that ethnicities such as Manyema, Nyamwezi, Arab and Swahili are mutable. However, she emphasises that this does not mean that "they could simply be switched from one day to another" and thus there existed constraints to the "shifts they could make". WaSwahili in Ujiji town on the border between Tanzania and Democratic Republic of Congo, many Manyema by origin, identify themselves as Swahili.

A German-Omani coproduction titled "House of Wonders" features the Manyema extensively.

== See also ==
- Tippu Tip
- Kasongo
- Swahili people
- Sultanate of Zanzibar
- Sultanate of Utetera
- Omani Empire
- Congo–Arab War
- Abushiri Revolt
