= Sultanate of Ujiji =

Sultanate in western Tanzania

Mwene Mbonwean Sultanate of Ujiji Usultani wa kienembonwe wa Ujiji
- Coat of arms
- Motto: God help the Sultan, bless the homeland
- Status: Independent state (–1893); Subnational monarchy (2017-)
- Capital: Busaidi
- Official languages: Swahili and Manyema
- Ethnic groups: Manyema
- Government: Absolute monarchy
  - Kolo: Othman Hamza Malilo II

Foundation
  - Establishment: c. 18 century in Ugoma, modern day Democratic Republic of Congo.
  - Restoration: 29 December 2017 in Ujiji, Tanzania.

Population
  - Estimate: 200,000
- Currency: Tanzanian shilling
- Time zone: UTC+3 (EAT)
- Calling code: 255

Mwene Mbonwean Sultanate of Ujiji or Busonga is a subnational Monarchy in Ujiji town, Kigoma Region, western Tanzania. The seat of the local Sultanate is Busaid which was called so from the name of the dynasty of both the Zanzibar Sultanate and Oman which once ruled Ujiji under Arab-Swahili Liwalis, the post Arab name of Busaid for Ujiji proper is still used by the locals as "Busaidi".

== Background ==
In Tanzania prior and during colonialism the newcomers from Belgian Congo collectively termed Wamanyema were politically included with the remained minority autochthonous Jiji population mainly by indirect rule under the local authority of the Arab-Swahili Liwalis of Ujiji with local representatives to the town council with their old dynasties being disregarded and remained active ritually within their respective clans.

One of the significant tribe of Wamanyema is the Wagoma who migrated en masse from ancient Ugoma which is now the northwestern corner of Lake Tanganyika in modern day Fizi and Kalemie of the Democratic Republic of Congo. The Wagoma migrated earlier than their fellow Manyemas due to their invention of dugout canoes mitumbwi ya mti mmoja or in goma language kabelele and their geographical proximity to Ujiji town, the Wagoma of ancient Ugoma migrated with their clans in sequences including the Bene Mbonwe who settled at Busaid. The old allegiance and traditional recognition of the spiritual significance of the ancestral chiefs remained intact even without temporal duties but it was recently in 2017 that the old Bene Mbonwe dynasty was restored at Ujiji by its senior members of the royal clan in Agnatic succession as the Mwene Mbonwean Sultanate of Ujiji and became the first Goma and Manyema traditional authority to have Ujiji as its royal seat.

== History ==
In Goma history the villages and hamlets were many before the emigration and wars and the traditional states comprised several number of them before the immigration of bembe people with significant numbers of chiefdoms or sultanates sometimes under the suzerainty of Uguhha Kingdom the southernmost goma state under the Bakwamamba Dynasty in modern Kalemie in Tanganyika district of Katanga Region in Democratic Republic of Congo. The Mbonwe Sultanate was incorporated within the newly colonial created groupement Babungwe Sud in the locality of Basikazumbe which is the maternal clan of current the Sultan.

On 24 July 1893 Germans entered Ujiji installing loyal sultan and ending independence of the state.

== Political organization ==
Politically Bahoma arrived in north-western shores of Lake Tanganyika in D.R.C with their centralized political institutions that had based on the recognition of autonomous rulers of their village groups with both temporal and spiritual powers vested on single individuals who had the power of life and death over their subjects, so traditionally there was no paramount chief of the entire Goma.

The traditional title of Bahoma Sultans and other related tribes is Kolo. The current Manyema Kolo of Ujiji is Othman Hamza Malilo II of the Royal House of Mwene Mbonwe itself being a branch of Basuma clan of Bahoma tribe of Wamanyema.

== Religion and culture ==
The Sultan is both temporal community leader and spiritual religious leader of the Monarchical polity. At the past the predecessors were ex officio High Priests of traditional religion that was based on the worship of pantheon of spirits under the Supreme God, "Kabezha Mpung'u" who was said to be above the heavens and was never depicted figuratively. After conversion to Islam and migration the Wagoma and other Manyema were adherents of Qadiri Order of Sufism, emphasized spiritual trend of Islam. The notion of Sacred Kingship remained intact under the Islamic spirituality with the Kolo or styled Sultan being considered the successor of Liwalis of Ujiji as the Muslim religious head of the riverain tribal lands from Utongwe, Ukaranga, Uguhha, Ugoma, Karamba, Ubwari, Massanze, Ubembe, Uvira to Rumonge. The Sultan maintains a Zawiya convent with neither Sufi order nor Silsila of which he is a Swahibul Maqam instead of traditional Ngolo shrine to keep his regalia.

There is cultural awakening and struggle for tribal consciousness and identity among the Wamanyema in recent years due to the efforts done by the Sultanate and other tribesmen. The efforts are driven by their neighbor tribes who see the Wamanyema as acculturated and ex slaves race due to their deep history of slavery and Arab domination which has muchly influenced their culture and history.

=== Language ===
The primary language spoken by the Wamanyema is Kiswahili variety which is closer to coastal Swahili in accent but with many vocabularies from the kimanyema vernacular dialects. There are some efforts by the royal court to replace the use of Swahili with Standardized form of Goma - Kabwari koine as Standard Manyema language so as to highlights the tribal and native identity for Wamanyema.

=== Cuisine ===
The main staple food of Wamanyema of Ujiji is Maize Ugali and Fish. The traditional Ugali of Rowe is mainly eaten by elders, and the Kolo in traditional occasions. Other dishes are Meat, yams, potatoes, mbwiti porridge, teas, togwa, mijabosi, kiembe, fuka porridge, bananas, kikwanga, mabenyee, magatoo, bajia, rice, mahole etc.

=== Initiation ===
Initiation into adulthood through circumcision was called by the Manyemas as "Yando" from Swahili Jando. The Swahili/Ngwana variety "Yando" was adopted with the songs being sang mainly in Swahili instead of Kimanyema. At Ujiji Manyema has dozens of initiatory societies of Mizuka spirits, Vibuka in singular Kibuka which masquerade in seasons with their spirits possession dances, the Vibuka are divided according to branches of tribal ancestry with Kiruwa being the most popular with several Vibuka and initiates followed by Kisongye, Kitwa and Kibisa, with Kingwana being acculturated universal Kiswahili Cult. The Lubunga is the form of traditional assembly with similarities of Pashtun Jirga but with initiatory protocols like most of central and west African polities, summoned by the Wagabo aides of the Swahilized Bugabo society. It is the Academy of culture, the fraternal Order, the Jury and the Parliament. The Sultan occupies the top grade in Bugabo Society.

Khadims are officiating in royal Zawiya as both the spiritual custodians of Sultanship as well as guides for the community and overseers of Islamic rituals that are pertaining to the royal court and Sultanate in general.

== Dynasty ==
The Sultan hails from the Royal House of Mwene Mbonwe which was one of the four major royal dynasties of Wagoma and the first one among the four to settle in Ujiji which the Wagoma consider it as their homeland inherited from old Wajiji through blood pact and call it in their language as Busong'a. All the Paramount Chiefs or Sultans from this royal house are styled Mwene Mbonwe, it was difficult to ascertain the names of the former sovereigns due to that and mass migration but the recent list is;

Sultan of Mbonwe-Ujiji

- Rumaliza (1883-1893)

Hamza Malilo Kizoela (titular 1970s - 2017) Othman Hamza Malilo II (2017 – present) as Sultan of Mwene Mbonwean Sultanate of Ujiji/Busonga

== Sources ==
- Burton, Richard F. (1860). The Lake Regions of Central Africa: A Picture of Exploration, Volume 1. Harper & Brothers Publishers: New York.
- Kigoma Development Association (Tanzania) (1994). The Baha and the related peoples of the Kigoma region.
- Marc Leo Felix (1987). 100 Peoples of Zaire and Their Sculpture: The Handbook. Zaire Basin Art History Research Foundation, 1987 - 246 pages.
- Biebuyck, Daniel P. (1982). Statuary from the Pre-Bembe Hunters: Issues in the Interpretation of Ancestral Figurines Ascribed to the Basikasingo-Bembe-Boyo. Royal Museum of Central Afrika, 1982 - 164 pages.
