= Lubao Airport =

Airport in the Democratic Republic of the Congo

- IATA: none; ICAO: FZWS

Summary
- Airport type: Public
- Serves: Lubao
- Elevation AMSL: 2,625 ft / 800 m
- Coordinates: 5°23′20″S 25°44′35″E

Map
- Location of the airport in Democratic Republic of the Congo

Runways
Direction	Length		Surface
Direction	m	ft	Surface
16/34	1,100	3,609	Grass
- Sources: Google Maps GCM

Lubao Airport (ICAO: FZWS) is an airport serving the city of Lubao in Lomami Province, Democratic Republic of the Congo.

== See also ==
- Transport in the Democratic Republic of the Congo
- List of airports in the Democratic Republic of the Congo
