= Kasaba Bay Airport =

- IATA: ZKB; ICAO: FLKY

Summary
- Airport type: Public
- Location: Kasaba Bay, Mpulungu District, Zambia
- Elevation AMSL: 2,780 ft (850 m)
- Coordinates: 8°31′20″S 30°39′55″E

Map
- Location of airport in Zambia (Northern Province in red)

Runways
Direction	Length		Surface
Direction	m	ft	Surface
06/24	2,100	6,890	Under reconstruction (2026)
- Source: GCM Google Maps

Kasaba Bay Airport (IATA: ZKB, ICAO: FLKY) is an airstrip built in the 1960s at Kasaba Bay Lodge in Nsumbu National Park on Lake Tanganyika in the Northern Province in Zambia. As of May 2026 it was not in use and undergoing reconstruction.

== History of flight operations ==
When first built, Kasaba Bay lodge and airport were not accessible by road, and transport by boat to Nsumbu and Mpulungu was the only option. The airport mainly served the Lodge but a boat could be sent from Nsumbu for transfers. It was only in the late 1960s that a dirt road was completed connecting Kasaba Bay to Nsumbu and the rest of Zambia.

Zambia Airways introduced scheduled services to Kasaba Bay in the late sixties, which otherwise was only used by private and government aircraft and charter services. The scheduled services were withdrawn in the 1980s when Zambia Airways had financial difficulties.

== Location ==
The runway is on a narrow isthmus between Kala Bay and Kasaba Bay, joining Inangu Peninsula to the mainland. Approach and departures are over the water. There are no existing airport buildings or facilities for passengers, as these were provided by the Lodge.

== Reconstruction ==
Up to 2009, the ashphalt runway was about 2100 m long and about 25 m wide but by 2013 it was covered over in gravel with a length of 2400 m and width of 60 m, with many piles of gravel, indicating early stages of construction work. There was no change up to the most recently-available satellite image date, 30 July 2024.

In December 2024 Transport and Logistics Minister Frank Tayali announced the construction of 'a new airport for Kasaba Bay'. However it was not stated when this would commence.

Since the 1990s the water level in Lake Tanganyka has risen by about 2 metres, flooding homes and structures along low-lying shores. Although it has not encroached on the airstrip, the water has claimed four structures at Kasaba Bay Lodge and now reaches the main building and the swimming pool. All the buildings are derelict, and plans for rebuilding the Lodge repeatedly made since the early 2000s, as of June 2026 have not been started.

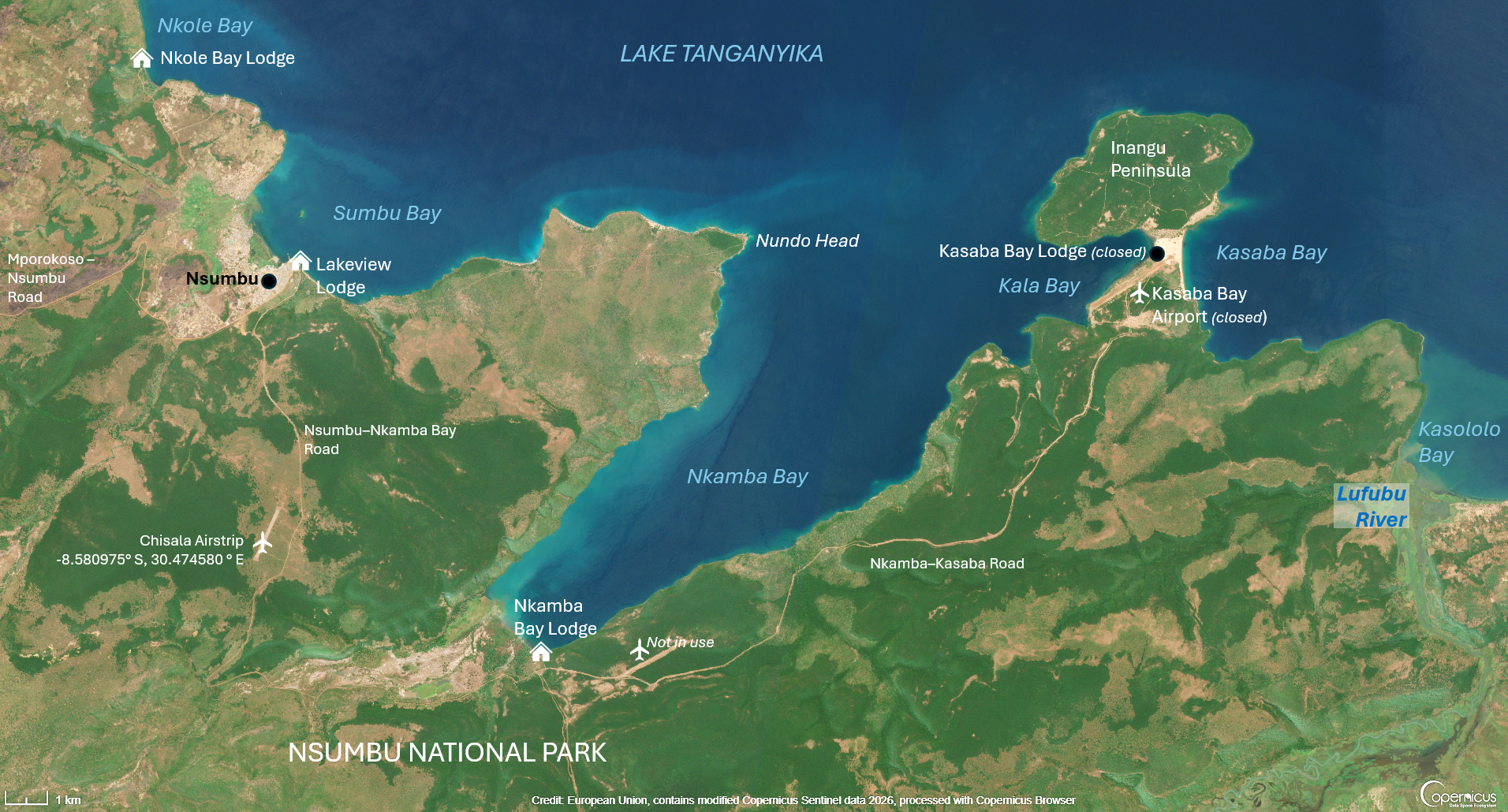
Satellite image-based map of Nsumbu, Nkamba Bay and Kasaba Bay showing airfields, May 2026.

== Alternative airstrips ==
When Kasaba Bay Airport closed for reconstruction, light aircraft flying to Nsumbu and the National Park used an airstrip for Nkamba Bay Lodge at 8°36′20.4″S 30°33′23.2″E.

In the early 2020s, a second airstrip was made closer to Nsumbu, called Chisala Airstrip, at 8°34′51.4″S 30°28′27.1″E. This has a gravel runway 1.2 km long, and several buildings. This airstrip is now used in preference to Nkamba Bay Lodge airstrip.

== See also ==
- Transport in Zambia
- List of airports in Zambia
- Nsumbu National Park
