= Tippu Tip's state =

19th-century African state

- 1860–1894
- Tippu Tip's State in relation to Zanzibar.
- Capital: Kasongo
- Common languages: Arabic, Swahili
- History
  - Established: 1860
  - Tippu Tip appointed as governor: 1887
  - Collapse of the state due to Congo Arab war: 1894
Succeeded by
Congo Free State

Tippu Tip's state (1860–1894), was a short-lived Arab state established in eastern Africa by the infamous Swahili slave trader Tippu Tip (Hamad al Murjebi) and his son Sefu in the 19th century. The capital of the state was the town of Kasongo, located in modern Maniema Province, Democratic Republic of the Congo. Tippu Tip's controlled territory reached as far to eastern Kasai and to Aruwimi Basin in the west.

== History ==
By the mid 19th century, the Arab traders arrived from the parts of the East African coast that were under the control of the Sultanate of Zanzibar. While the Arab traders were already engaged in important and different trade activities, they continued searching for ivory, gold and slaves.

Arab settlements in the African interior and trade stations were to be found in many locations, including the most important trade stations at Lualaba, Nyangwe and Kasongo. The Arab traders and explorers were not interested in converting locals to their faith, nor did they seek to bond with local chiefs, but rather to establish trading stations and regular flow of trading goods to Zanzibar.

At some point between 1867 and 1874, Tippu Tip led an expedition in search of ivory to the Sultanate of Utetera, a small African state between the Lualaba and Lomami rivers in what is now southwestern Maniema. On his travels, Tippu Tip met Pange Bondo, a deposed former sultan of Utetera. When Tippu Tip arrived in Utetera, the reigning sultan Kassongo Rushie was at war with several of his neighbours, the most notable of which was the Sultan of Mkahuja. After a brief battle, Tippu Tip agreed to restore Pange Bondo to the throne of Utetera, which was recognised by the Mkahuja. When Tippu Tip and his men arrived at the capital of Utetera, they swiftly deposed Kassongo Rushie; according to Tippu Tip's own account, Kassongo voluntarily surrendered sovereignty to him without a battle, which may be true as Kassongo would go on to serve under Tippu Tip. Tippu Tip thus became ruler of Utetera in his own right for several years, in which he expanded the state and established a tributary system over many of the local sultans. Whether Tippu Tip held the title of Sultan of Utetera for the entire duration of his dominion over the eastern Congo is however unclear, as he had already recognised Pange Bondo as such and the title was traditionally passed regularly between rulers of different lineages, rather than being held for life and passed down to descendants. In either case, Pange Bondo served as a loyal tributary ruler under Tippu Tip.

Tippu Tip's controlled territory ultimately became part of the Congo Free State.
