= Nyangwe =

Town in Maniema

Coordinates: 4°13′S 26°11′E

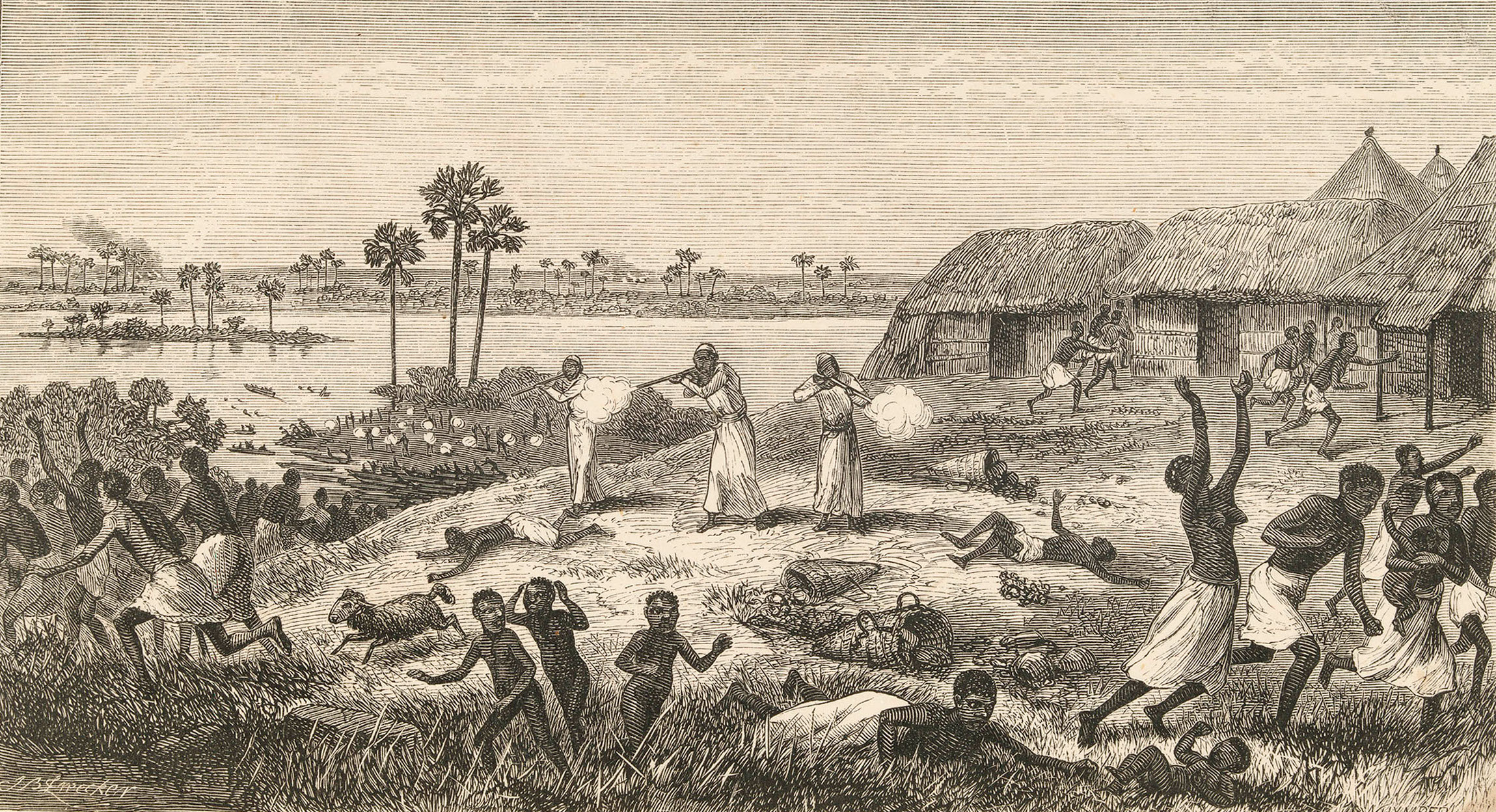
Arab slavers shooting at women at the market of Nyangwe during the massacre witnessed by David Livingstone in 1871

Nyangwe is a town on the right bank of the Lualaba River, in the Maniema Province in the east of the Democratic Republic of the Congo (territory of Kasongo). In the second half of the 19th century, it was an important Swahili–Arab hub for trade goods like ivory, gold, iron and slaves, remaining one of the main slave trading centres until the Congo Arab war.

The town was founded as an Arab trading depot around 1860. It subsequently became a part of the Sultanate of Utetera, ruled by the Swahili slave trader Tippu Tip and associated with the Zanzibar slave trade of the Sultanate of Zanzibar.

David Livingstone was the first European to visit Nyangwe in 1871. According to his notes, the Swahili–Arabs had driven away the original inhabitants of the area, the Wagenya, when establishing their town. As a result, the Wagenya had become distrustful of any foreigners visiting the region.

On 15 July 1871, Livingstone witnessed around 400 to 500 Africans being massacred by Arab slavers at the Nyangwe market on the banks of the Lualaba, while he was watching next to the leading Arab trader Dugumbe who had given him assistance. As he recorded in his field diary, the attack was an act of retaliation for actions of Manilla, a head slave who had sacked villages of Mohombo people at the instigation of the Wagenya chieftain Kimburu. The Arabs attacked Kimburu's people as well as anyone they found to be present at the market.

Researchers from the Indiana University of Pennsylvania who scanned Livingstone's diary suggest that in putting his fragmentary notes about the massacre into the narrative of his journal, he left out his concerns about some of his followers, slaves owned by Banyan merchants who had been hired by John Kirk, acting British Consul at Zanzibar, and sent to get Livingstone to safety. These slaves had been liberated and added to his party, but had shown violent conduct against local people contrary to his instructions, and he feared they might have been involved in starting the massacre. His diary notes "Dugumbe's men murdering Kimburu and another for slaves" and implied that the slave Manilla played a leading part, but looking back at the events, he says Dugumbe's people bore responsibility and started it to make an example of Manilla. In the diary he described his sending his men with protection of a flag to assist Manilla's brother, in his journal version it was to assist villagers. The edited version published posthumously in Livingstone's Last Journals in 1874 left out the context of Livingstone's earlier comments about Kirk and bad behaviour of the hired Banyan men, and omitted the villagers' earlier violent resistance to Arab slavers, thus portraying the villagers as passive victims. The section on the massacre itself had only minor grammatical corrections.

When Livingstone visited Nyangwe, it was the last known town for people coming from the east, and Livingstone thought that the Lualaba was the upper part of the Nile. In 1877 Henry Morton Stanley followed the river downstream from Nyangwe with support of the local ruler, Tippu Tip, and as he arrived in Boma, he had established that it was actually one of the sources of the Congo River.

Other European visitors to the town were Verney Lovett Cameron in 1874 and Hermann Wissmann in 1883.

== See also ==
- Cannibalism in Africa § Congo Basin
