= Verney Lovett Cameron =

English traveller in Central Africa (1844-1894)

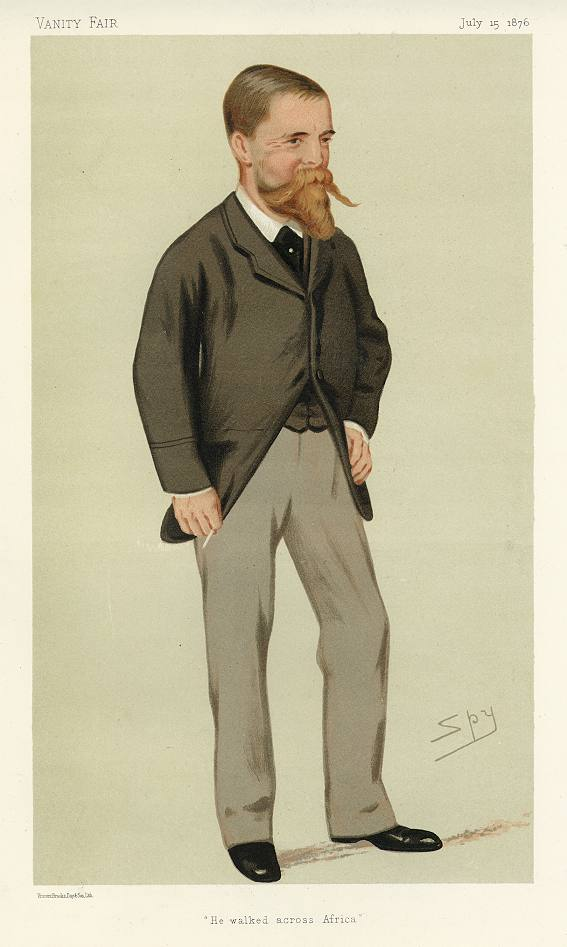
"He walked across Africa" Cameron as caricatured by Spy (Leslie Ward) in Vanity Fair, July 1876

Verney Lovett Cameron (1 July 1844 – 24 March 1894) was an English traveller in Central Africa and the first European to cross (1875) equatorial Africa from sea to sea.

== Biography ==
He was born at Radipole, near Weymouth, Dorset, son of Rev Jonathan Lovett Cameron and Frances Sapte. He entered the Royal Navy in 1857, served in the Abyssinian campaign of 1868, and was employed for a considerable time in the suppression of the East African slave trade.

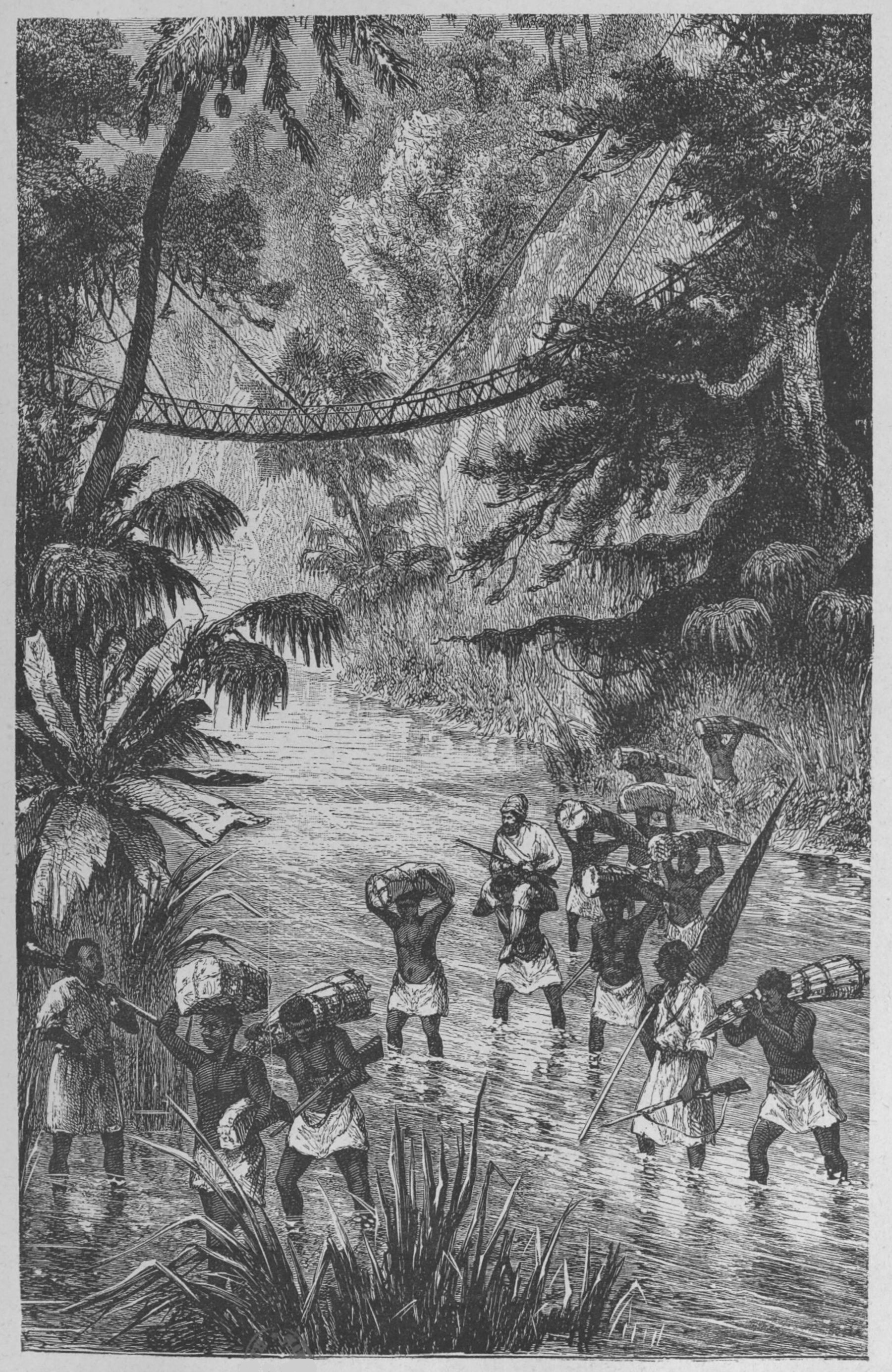
Expedition to Africa

The experience thus obtained led to his being selected to command an expedition sent by the Royal Geographical Society in 1873, to assist Dr Livingstone. He was also instructed to make independent explorations, guided by Livingstone's advice. Soon after the departure of the expedition from Zanzibar, a caravan of about 80 led by Chuma and Susi were met bearing the dead body of the reverend doctor. Cameron's two European companions, Dr William Edward Dillon, surgeon in the Royal Navy, and Lieutenant Cecil Murphy of the Royal Artillery, turned back to join the task of returning Livingstone's body to the coast. Cameron continued his march and reached Ujiji, on Lake Tanganyika, in February 1874, where he found and sent to England Livingstone's papers.

Cameron spent some time determining the true form of the southern part of the lake, and solved the question of its outlet by the discovery of the Lukuga River. From Tanganyika he struck westward to Nyangwe, the Arab town on the Lualaba previously visited by Livingstone. This river Cameron rightly believed to be the main stream of the Congo, and he endeavoured to procure canoes to follow it down. In this he was unsuccessful, owing to his refusal to countenance slavery, and he, therefore, turned southwest. After tracing the Congo-Zambezi watershed for hundreds of miles he reached Bihe and finally arrived at the coast on 28 November 1875, being the first European to cross equatorial Africa from sea to sea. He was awarded the Royal Geographical Society's Founder's Medal in 1876.

His travels, which were published in 1877 under the title Across Africa, contain valuable suggestions for the opening up of the continent, including the utilization of the great lakes as a Cape to Cairo Road connection. In recognition of his work, he was promoted to the rank of Commander.

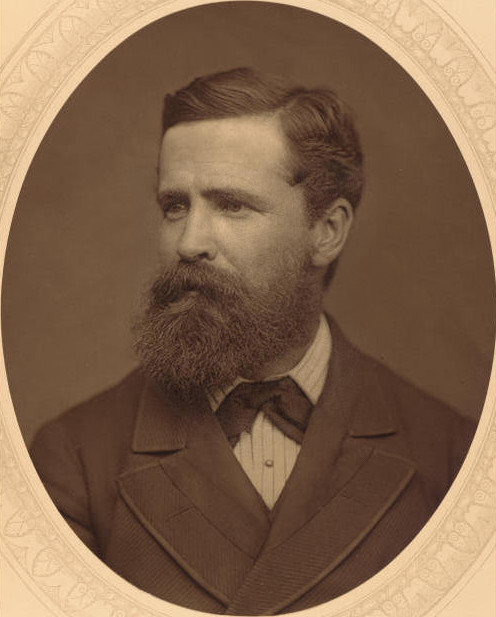
Verney Lovett Cameron in 1878

The remainder of Cameron's life was chiefly devoted to projects for the commercial development of Africa, and to editing and writing. His last work was the editing of the personal adventure narrative of the Master Mariner James Choyce, who had sailed as a teenager in 1797 aboard a whaler to the Pacific Ocean. Choyce's narrative covering 26 years of seafaring life is one of the earliest works of an Englishman's experiences in South America.

Cameron in 1878–1879 visited the Euphrates valley in connection with a proposed railway to the Persian Gulf, and accompanied Sir Richard Burton in his West African journey of 1882. At the Gold Coast Cameron surveyed the Tarkwa region, and he was joint author with Burton of To the Gold Coast for Gold (1883). In the 1880s he published several books for boys emulating his sister-in-law Mrs. Lovett Cameron who wrote romantic fiction.

He was killed, near Leighton Buzzard, by a fall from horseback when returning from hunting in 1894. He had married Amy, the daughter of William Morris of Jamaica.

A second edition of Across Africa, with new matter and corrected maps, appeared in 1885. A summary of Cameron's great journey, from his own pen, appears in Dr Robert Brown's The Story of Africa, vol. II, pp. 266–279 (London, 1893).

Across Africa was republished in 2005.

== Works ==
- The Cruise of the "Black Prince" Privateer (1886)
- In Savage Africa (1887)
- To The Gold Coast for Gold: A Personal Narrative. Vol. I, II
- Among The Turks(1890)
