= Lubao, Democratic Republic of the Congo =

Town in Lomami, DRC

Coordinates: 5.385°S 25.745°E

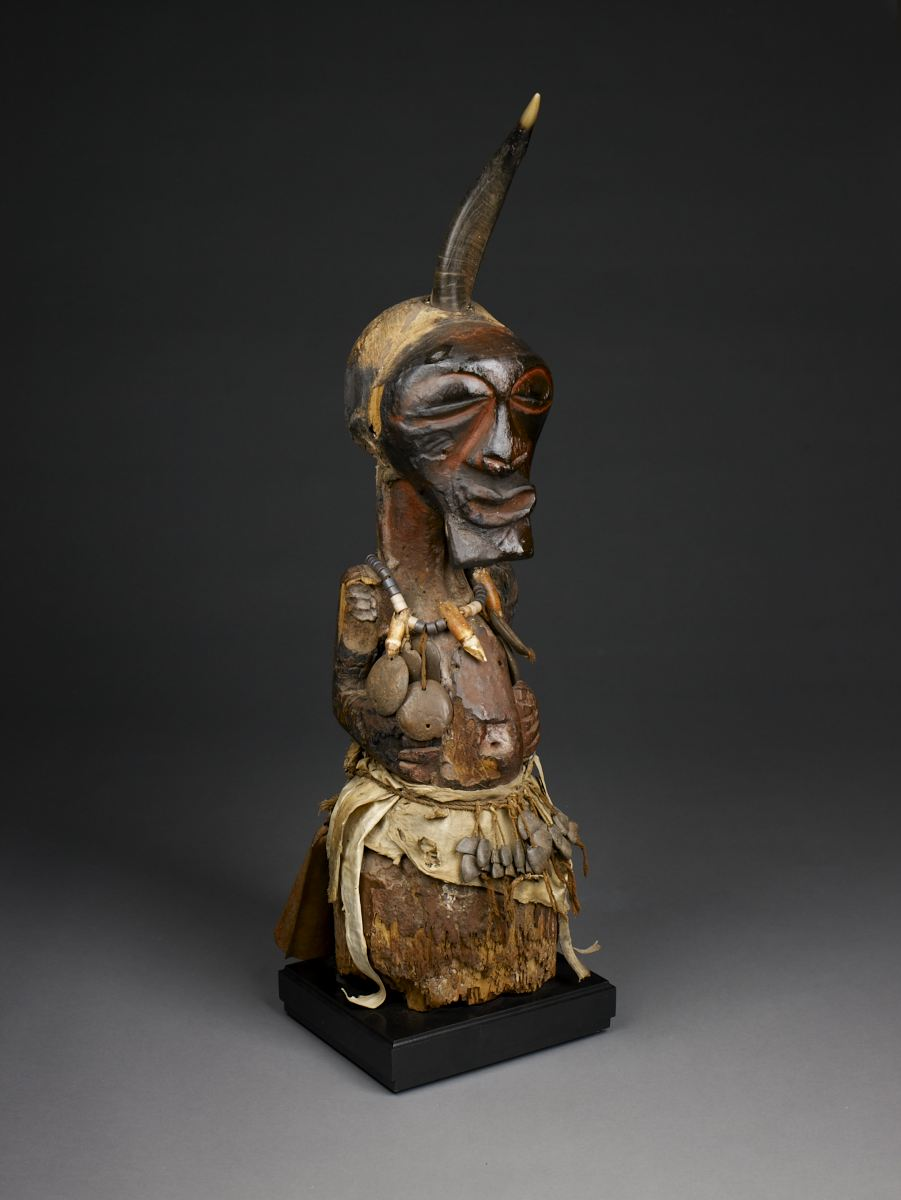
Early 20th century power figure of the Songye people of Lubou

Lubao is a town in Lomami province, Kasai-Oriental Province, Democratic Republic of the Congo. The town is the administrative center of the territory of the same name. It lies near the eastern bank of the Lomami River.

The town is served by Lubao Airport. Economic activity in the surrounding area includes diamond mining, and the town is a centre for diamond trading.
