= Lomami River =

River in Congo DR

Coordinates: 0°46′N 24°16′E

Map of DR Congo showing the Lomami River in red

The Lomami River (Swahili: Mto Lomami, French: Rivière Lomami, Dutch: Lomami Rivier) is a major tributary of the Congo River in the Democratic Republic of the Congo. The river is approximately 1,280 km (800 mi) long. It flows north, west of and parallel to the upper Congo.

The Lomami rises in the south of the country, near Kamina and the Congo–Zambezi divide. It flows north through Lubao, Tshofa, Kombe, Bolaiti, Opala, and Irema before joining the Congo at Isangi.

Henry Morton Stanley reached the confluence of the two rivers on 6 Jan. 1877, "the affluent Lumami, which Livingstone calls 'Young's river,' entered the great stream, by a mouth 600 yards wide, between low banks densely covered with trees."

In October 1889 M. Janssen, Governor-General of the Congo State, explored the Lomani river upstream from Isangi on the Ville de Bruxelles. After steaming for 116 hours he was stopped by rapids at a latitude of 4°27'2" S.

The river has lent its name to a number of biological species, including the monkey Cercopithecus lomamiensis and the flowering plant Pavetta lomamiensis.

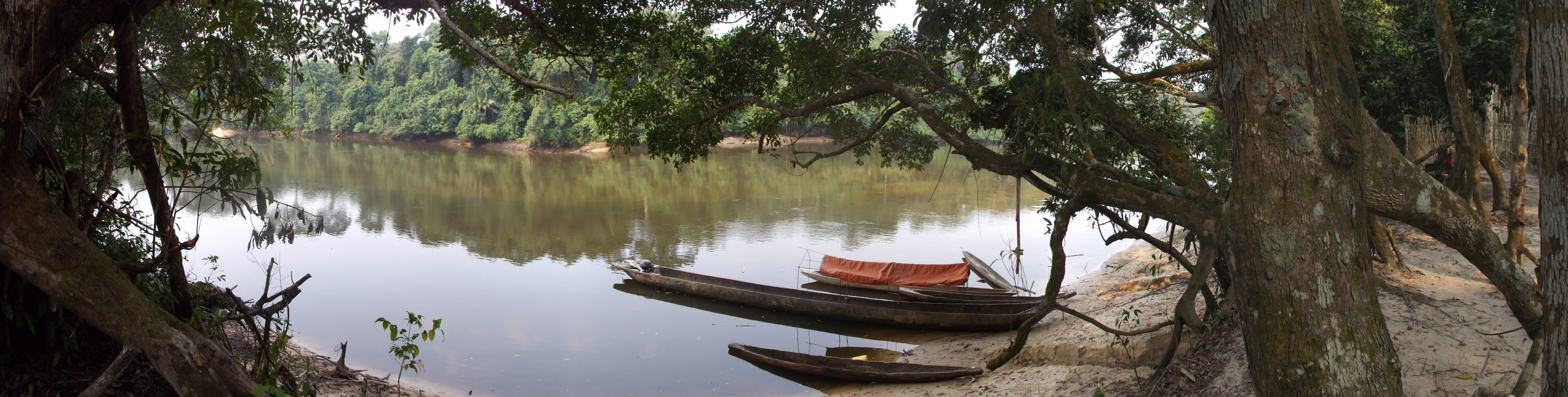
