= Kasongo =

Town and territory in Maniema

Kasongo Territory
- Territory
- Location within Democratic Republic of the Congo
- Coordinates: 4°27′S 26°39′E
- Country: Democratic Republic of Congo
- Province: Maniema
- Founder: Afro-Arabs • Shirazis • Waungwana (town)
- Elevation: 666 m (2,185 ft)

Population
  - Total: 63,000
- National language: Kiswahili

Kasongo, also known as Piani Kasongo, is a town and territory in the Maniema Province in the east of the Democratic Republic of the Congo.

== Geography ==
Kasongo lies east of the Lualaba River, northwest of where it meets the Luama River, at an altitude of 666 metres (2,185 ft). Its population is approximately 63,000.

The town is served by Kasongo Airport. Kasongo is connected to the provincial capital Kindu by the 240 kilometres (150 mi) Kasongo Road (a section of National Road 31 (N31)), but the journey takes two days due to the road's poor state. The City also lies on National Road 2 (N2) and Regional Road 629 (R629).

Kasongo is part of the Roman Catholic Diocese of Kasongo.

== History ==
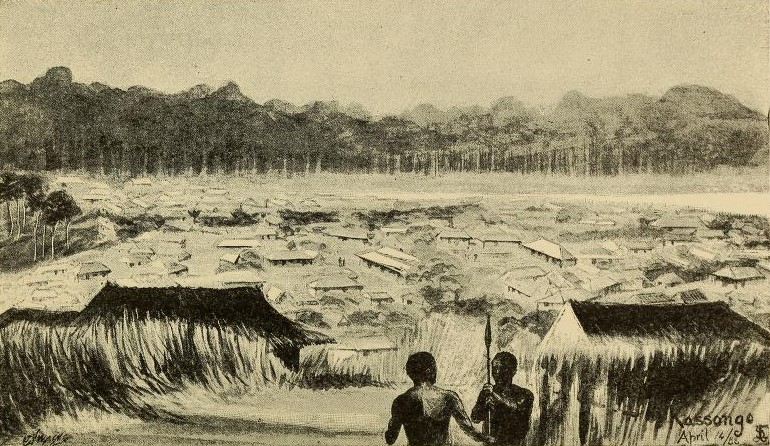
Kasongo in 1888

The houses are well built, partly painted with white clay or lime obtained from Lualaba shells; instead of simple trunks, large clay pillars or even carved wooden columns support the porched roofs; all the windows are protected by wooden grills, and the massive doors are decorated and have iron locks; they are also painted with Koranic verses; they are the pride of the owner.

— Hermann von Wissmann, Unter deutscher Flagge quer durch Afrika von West nach Ost: Von 1880 bis 1883

During the second half of the nineteenth century, merchants from the east coast of Africa extended their influence into eastern Central Africa, gaining control over a vast area of the Upper Congo Basin, from Lake Tanganyika in the east to the Lualaba River in the west and from the Lukuga River in the south to the Aruwimi River in the north.

They consolidated a network of caravan routes, containing stop overs, entrepôts and trading localities that enabled them to circulate goods that were in high demand on the markets of the coast and the Indian Ocean. This major phenomenon was to have a considerable impact on the political, economic and cultural development of Central Africa.

The town was founded by Swahili-Arab traders. A few years later it became the capital of the newly founded and short-lived Sultanate of Utetera, established and initially ruled by the Swahili–Arab slave and ivory trader Tippu Tip. The small sultanate was a key trading partner and ally of the Sultanate of Zanzibar in the east.

Oskar Lenz, travelling in Central Africa between 1885 and 1887, provided the details of Kasongo's layout writing:

Unlike Nyangwe, Kasongo gives the impression of a town; the houses are laid out to form streets; space is limited because the valley is narrow; gardens and fields are located outside the town around the farms that are scattered in the surrounding area. It is an important trading centre for ivory and slaves, and its location was cleverly chosen by the Arabs

— "L'expédition autrichienne au Congo", Bulletin de la Société Royale Belge de Géographie 11: 209–245.

The area was visited by Henry Morton Stanley in the early 1880s, on his third expedition. James Sligo Jameson, who took part in the 1888 expedition led by Stanley for the rescue of Emin Pasha, the former governor of the Egyptian province of Equatoria (in modern South Sudan), confirms Lenz's observation on the area noting that:

The gardens of the city extend for a great distance all around. The town is built on both sides of the valley and is very large. My house is beautiful and clean, the best Arab house I have ever been in.

— The Story of the Rear Column of the Emin Pasha Relief Expedition, National Publishing Company

Trivier, a French journalist, estimated the town's population at 20,000 in 1889, while Sidney Langford Hinde, a British doctor who took part in the siege of Kasongo, noted that it was a large centre with perhaps 60,000 inhabitants. Hinde describes the area as a maze of streets and fortified places.

The territory was at the centre of the Congo Arab war in the early 1890s. When Kasongo was conquered the Belgian commander Francis Dhanis, many of its defenders were killed and eaten by auxiliary Tetela troops. Dhanis's officers ignored the "smell of cooked human flesh" coming from their camps because "trying to punish or prevent them from feasting on the remains of their enemies would have been madness – they would have turned on us", as one of them commented.

A century later, Kasongo and its inhabitants were severely affected by the Second Congo War (1998–2003).

== See also ==
- Congolian rainforests
- Manyema
- Nyangwe
- Omani Empire
- Sultanate of Utetera
- Sultanate of Zanzibar
