= Boyoma Falls =

Congo River waterfalls in Orientale Province, DRC

Coordinates: 0°29′28″N 25°12′23″E

Boyoma Falls Chutes de Boyoma Boyomawatervallen Maporomoko ya Maji ya Boyoma
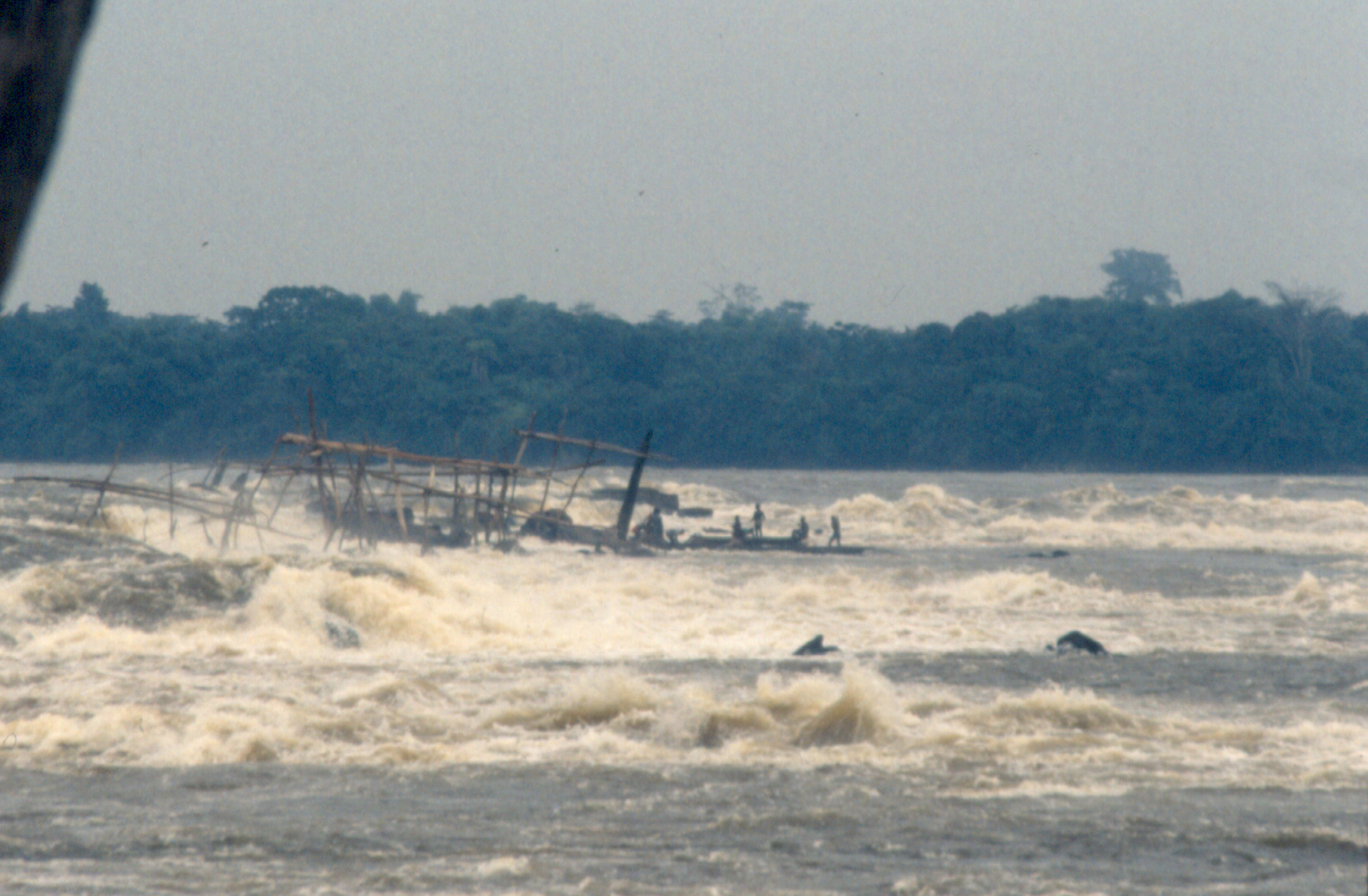
- Boyoma Falls.
- Interactive map of Boyoma Falls; Chutes de Boyoma; Boyomawatervallen; Maporomoko ya Maji ya Boyoma
- Location: Lualaba River, Kisangani, Democratic Republic of the Congo
- Type: Cataract
- Total height: 200 feet (61 m)
- Average width: 4,500 feet (1,400 m)
- Watercourse: Congo River
- Average flow rate: 16,990 m^{3}/s (600,000 cu ft/s)

Boyoma Falls (Swahili: Maporomoko ya Maji ya Boyoma, French: Chutes de Boyoma, Dutch: Boyomawatervallen), formerly known as Stanley Falls (French: Chutes Stanley; Dutch: Stanleywatervallen), is a series of seven cataracts, each no more than 5 m (16 ft) high, extending over more than 100 km (62 mi) along a curve of the Lualaba River between the river port towns of Ubundu and Kisangani (also known as Boyoma) in the Orientale Province of the Democratic Republic of the Congo. The seven cataracts have a total drop of 61 m (200 ft). They form the largest waterfall by volume of annual flow rate in the world, exceeding both the Niagara Falls and the Iguazu Falls.

The two major cataracts are the first below Ubundu, forming a narrow and crooked stream that is hardly accessible, and the last that can be seen and visited from Kisangani. At the bottom of the rapids, the Lualaba is known as the Congo River. A 1 m-gauge (3 ft 3 in) portage railway bypasses the series of rapids, connecting Kisangani and Ubundu.

The last of the seven cataracts of the Boyoma Falls is also known as the Wagenia Falls (French: Chutes Wagenia, Dutch: Wageniawatervallen), referring to the local Wagenya fishermen, who have developed a special technique to fish in the river. They build systems of wooden tripods across the rapids fixed in holes carved in the rock by the water current. These serve as anchors for baskets that entrap large fish. The baskets are lowered in the rapids to "sieve" the waters for fish. It is a very selective fishing method, as these baskets are quite big, and only large fish are entrapped.

The falls were formerly named after Henry Morton Stanley, who explored the region and noted the fishing technique of the Wagenya. According to Stanley, "...by taking advantage of the rocks, the natives have been enabled to fix upright heavy poles, 6 inches (150 mm) in diameter, to each of which they attach enormous fish-baskets by means of rattan-cane cable. There are probably sixty or seventy baskets laid in the river on each side, every day; and though some may be brought up empty, in general they seem to be tolerably successful, for out of half-a-dozen baskets...twenty-eight large fish were collected..."

== Gallery ==
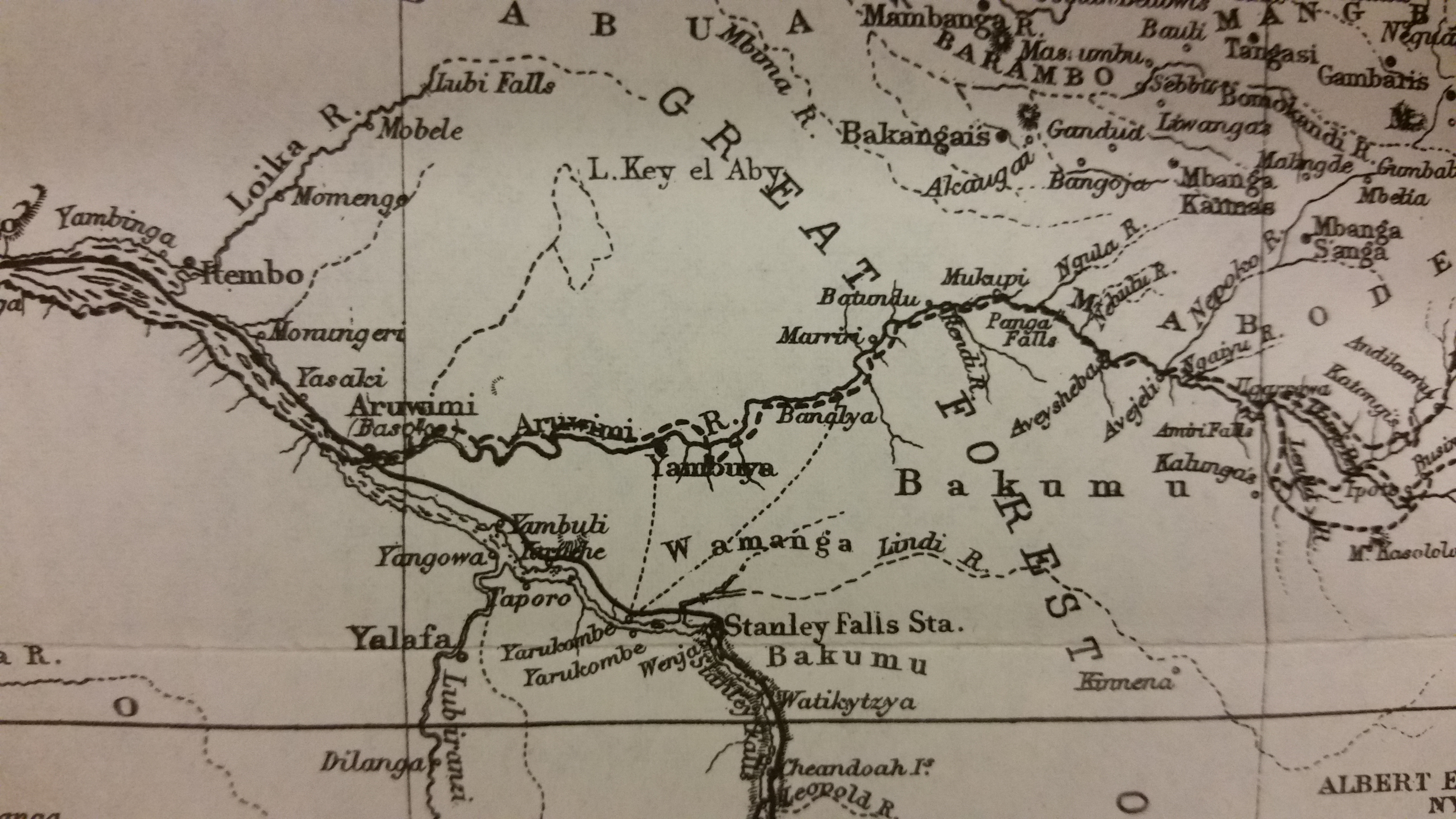
The falls are in the bottom center of Stanley's map. His route is indicated by the solid black line.

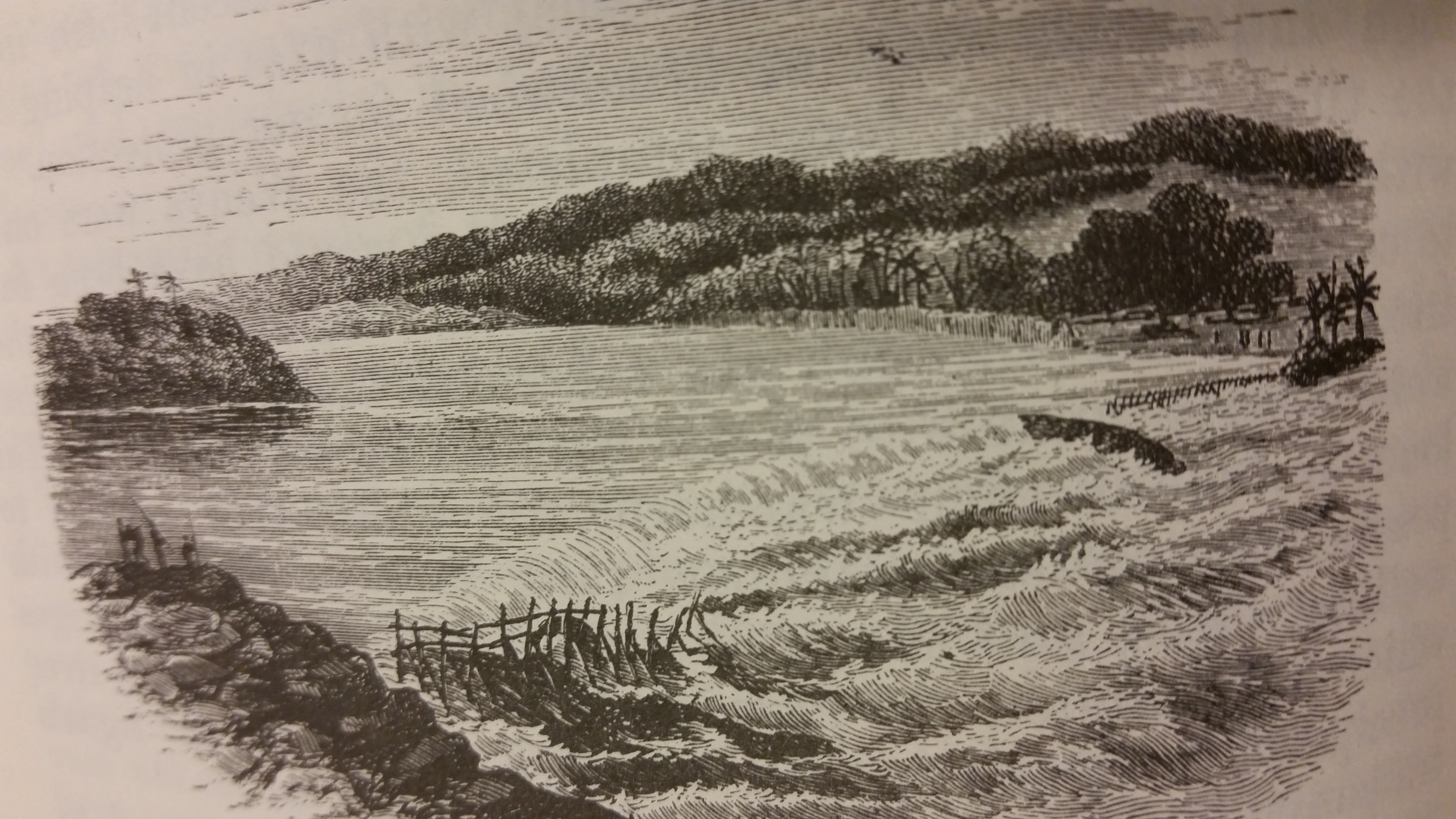
Stanley Falls as interpreted by Stanley.

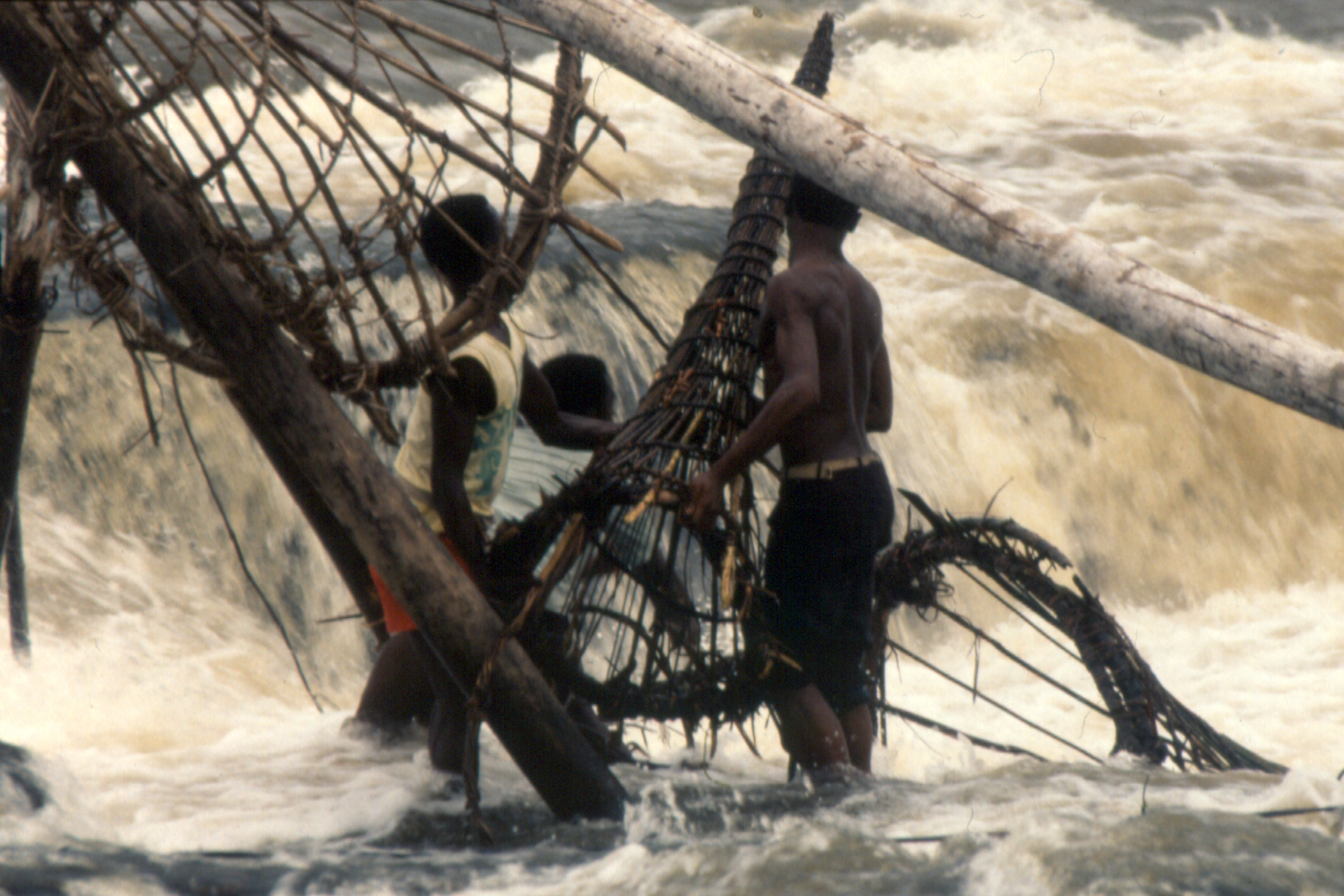
Wagenya fishermen at Wagenia Falls

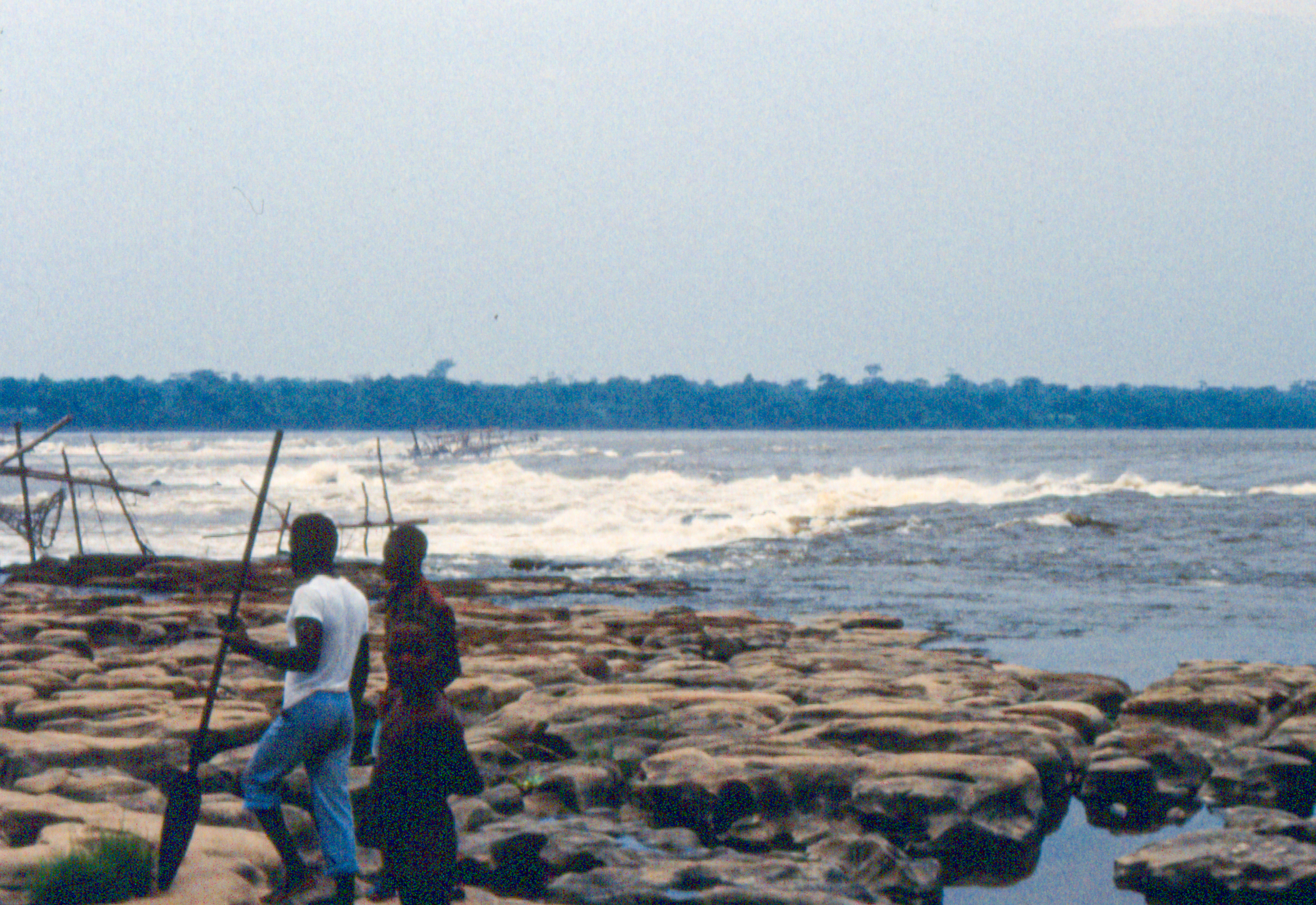
Wagenia Falls.

== See also ==
- List of waterfalls
