= Congo Arab war =

1892–1894 war in Central Africa

- Part of the Scramble for Africa and end of the East African slave trade
- Map of the war
Date	1892 – December 1894
Location	Eastern Congo Basin
Result	Congo Free State victory

Belligerents
Congo Free State; Supported by: Belgium	(Muscat and Oman) Tippu Tip's state (Muscat and Oman) Arab-Swahili sultanates in Eastern Congo; Supported by: Sultanate of Ujiji; Sultanate of Zanzibar; Sultanate of Muscat

Commanders and leaders
(Congo Free State) Francis Dhanis (Congo Free State) Louis-Napoléon Chaltin (Congo Free State) Ngongo Lutete (mid 1892–Sept. 1893)	(Muscat and Oman) Sefu bin Hamid † (Muscat and Oman) Rumaliza; Ngongo Lutete (until mid 1892) (Muscat and Oman) Said bin Al-Bedi (executed)

Units involved
Force Publique	Various Zanzibari slaver armies

Strength
3,500 regular soldiers 10,000–15,000 Ruga-Ruga irregulars and levies ~15,000–20,000 total	1,500–2,000 Zanzibari mercenaries and slavers 70,000+ Ruga-Ruga irregulars and levies

Casualties and losses
15 European commanders killed or executed 300–500 Force Publique killed 10,000+ Ruga Ruga killed	Hundreds of slavers killed or captured and executed ~600 Zanzibari mercenaries killed 70,000+ tribal levies and Ruga Ruga killed
- Several tens of thousands, possibly upwards of 100,000 killed, both levies and civilians Several European arms dealers in the Eastern Congo executed, notably Charles Stokes

The Congo Arab war was a colonial war between the Congo Free State and Arab-Swahili warlords associated with the Indian Ocean slave trade in the eastern regions of the Congo Basin between 1892 and 1894.

The war was caused by the Free State and the Arabs contending for the control of regional resources. The war ended in January 1894 with a victory of Leopold's Force Publique. Initially, the Free State collaborated with the Arabs. Still, competition struck over the control of ivory and the topic of the humanitarian pledges given by Leopold II, King-Sovereign of the Congo Free State, to the Berlin Conference to end slavery. Leopold II's stance turned confrontational against his once-allies. The war against the Swahili-Arab economic and political power was presented as a Christian anti-slavery crusade.

== Prelude ==
In 1886, while Tippu Tip was in Zanzibar, a dispute arose between Tippu Tip's fort at Stanley Falls (modern-day Boyoma Falls) and a smaller, nearby Congo Free State fort led by Walter Deane and Lieutenant Dubois. Tip's men at the Stanley Falls fort alleged that Deane had stolen an enslaved woman from an Arab officer, but Deane asserted that the girl had fled after being badly beaten by her master, and that he had only offered her refuge.

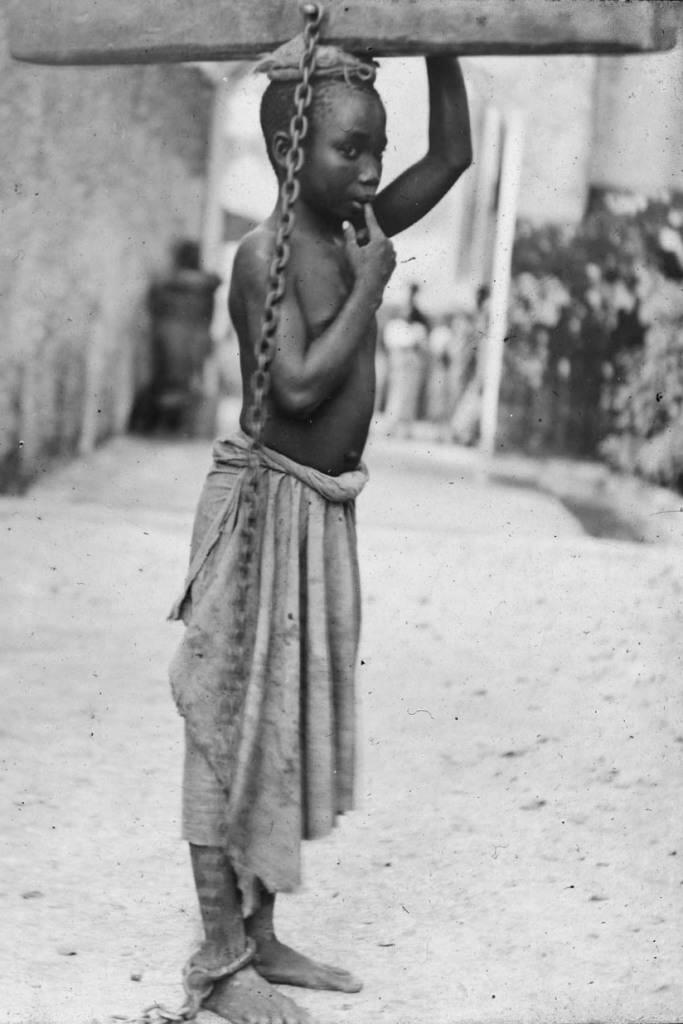
A photograph of an enslaved child in Zanzibar c. 1890

Tippu Tip's men attacked the fort which was defended by the two officers, eighty Nigerian Hausas and sixty local militiamen — and after a four-day siege, the defenders ran out of ammunition and fled, abandoning the fort. The Free State did not counterattack, and Tippu Tip began to move more men into the Congo, including several Arab slaver captains and some Congolese leaders, e.g. Ngongo Lutete.

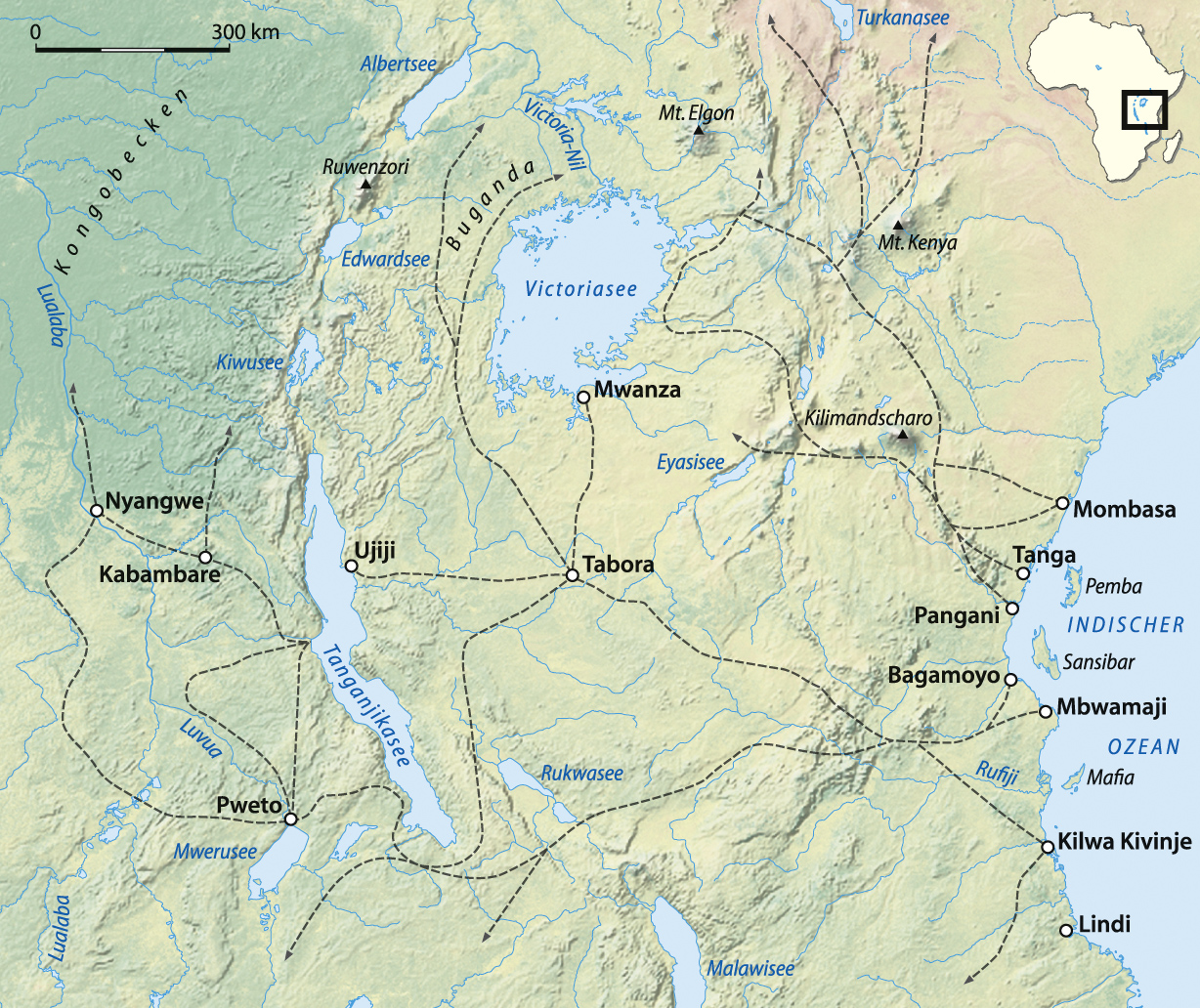
Arab East African slave routes c. 1890

Initially, the Congo Free State's authority was relatively weak in Congo's eastern regions. In early 1887, Henry Morton Stanley arrived in Zanzibar and proposed that Tippu Tip (nom de guerre — his real name was Hamad bin Muhammad bin Juma bin Rajab el Murjebi) be made governor (wali) of the Stanley Falls District in the Congo Free State. Both Leopold II and Barghash bin Said agreed. On February 24, 1887, Tippu Tip accepted. Tippu Tip agreed to submit to Congo Free State's authority and to allow a Congo Free State Resident by his side to help him govern this territory in a system of indirect rule which was patterned after those employed by other European colonial powers in Africa and Asia. The territory borders were the Aruwimi and the Lualaba rivers.

Additionally, Tippu Tip was to redirect his ivory trade through the Congo Free State, to the Atlantic Ocean ports and he was to assist King Leopold II's forces in their expeditions to the Upper Nile, to help further expand his territories. Soon after this deal, it became apparent that Tippu Tip was not inclined to accept Congo Free State authority and considered himself more of a vassal than a state official, allowed to do as he pleased, within certain boundaries. Furthermore, Tippu Tip did not have absolute authority over the eastern Congo region, but was considered as a primus inter pares. Other major slave traders like Lake Tanganyika's strongman Rumaliza considered his deal with the Congo Free State treasonous. Rumaliza abolished the Congo Free State flag and swore loyalty to the Zanzibar sultan's red flag.

Leopold II was heavily criticized in European public opinion for his dealings with Tippu Tip. In Belgium, the Belgian Anti-Slavery Society, founded in 1888, mainly by Roman Catholic intellectuals led by Count Hippolyte d'Ursel, aimed to abolish the East African slave trade. Free State authorities stringently adhered to the provisions of the Brussels Conference Act of 1890 which prohibited the trade of breechloading firearms and ammunition in "tropical" parts of Africa. In May or June 1890, Tippu Tip left Maniema and returned to Zanzibar, leaving his son, Sefu bin Hamid, in charge of most of his territory from the governing seat of Kasongo, and his nephew, Rashid bin Mohammad, in charge of Stanley Falls.

== Course of the war ==
Significant locations in the Congo Arab war

In March and April 1892, Tippu Tip's son Sefu bin Hamid began attacking Congo Free State personnel in eastern Congo, including ivory trader Arthur Hodister—sent by the Syndicat Commercial du Katanga to 'acquire' ivory—and Captain Guillaume Van Kerckhoven, who had been forcefully confiscating ivory from several powerful Arab traders. These expeditions united regional slave and ivory traders to fight their common enemy, the Congo Free State. The Times reported in 1892 that, during further explorations in the Congo, Hodister was captured and killed, his head stuck on a pole. Relations were further strained when Rashid refused to assist in the investigation of Hodister's death. Ngongo Lutete also led actions in the east at this time.

=== Initial hostilities ===
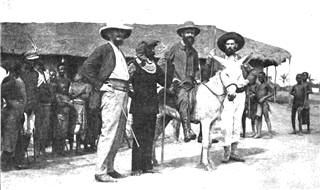
Francis Dhanis in the Congo. His better-armed forces defeated Rumaliza, c. 1900

The Force Publique, under Francis Dhanis, was sent to Katanga to resupply the Lofoi trading post, establishing new outposts on his path. During this mission, the Force Publique crossed paths with Ngongo Lutete's soldiers. Lutete had been captured by Tippu Tip as a boy; after winning his freedom, he became the leader of the Batetela and Bakusu. Lutete's forces were heading west to Kasaï, picking up weapons from Angola in an attempt to strengthen their position in the Lomani region.

After several skirmishes in April–May 1892 with the better equipped Free State forces of Dhanis and Michaux, Lutete decided to make a deal with the Congo Free State. On 19 September, he switched sides and joined the Force Publique. Other native leaders like Pania Mutomba before him and Lupungu, chief of the Songe at Kabinda shortly thereafter, also joined the Force Publique.

=== Maniema campaign ===
By October 1892, Sefu was leading a force of 10,000 men (some 500 Zanzibari officers, the rest Congolese). The Force Publique army led by Francis Dhanis, consisted of a few dozen Belgian officers and several thousand African auxiliaries. Open warfare broke out in late November 1892, when Sefu set up a fort on the Lomami River, where the Force Publique attacked him and eventually was forced to retreat. Dhanis used this battle as a pretext for advancing against the Arabs in force. He allowed his army to travel with all of their wives, slaves, and servants, who did all of the army's cooking and cleaning and acted as a supply train. In addition, he did not allow his men to harm local non-combatants, earning him the goodwill of the local people.

=== Rumaliza campaign ===
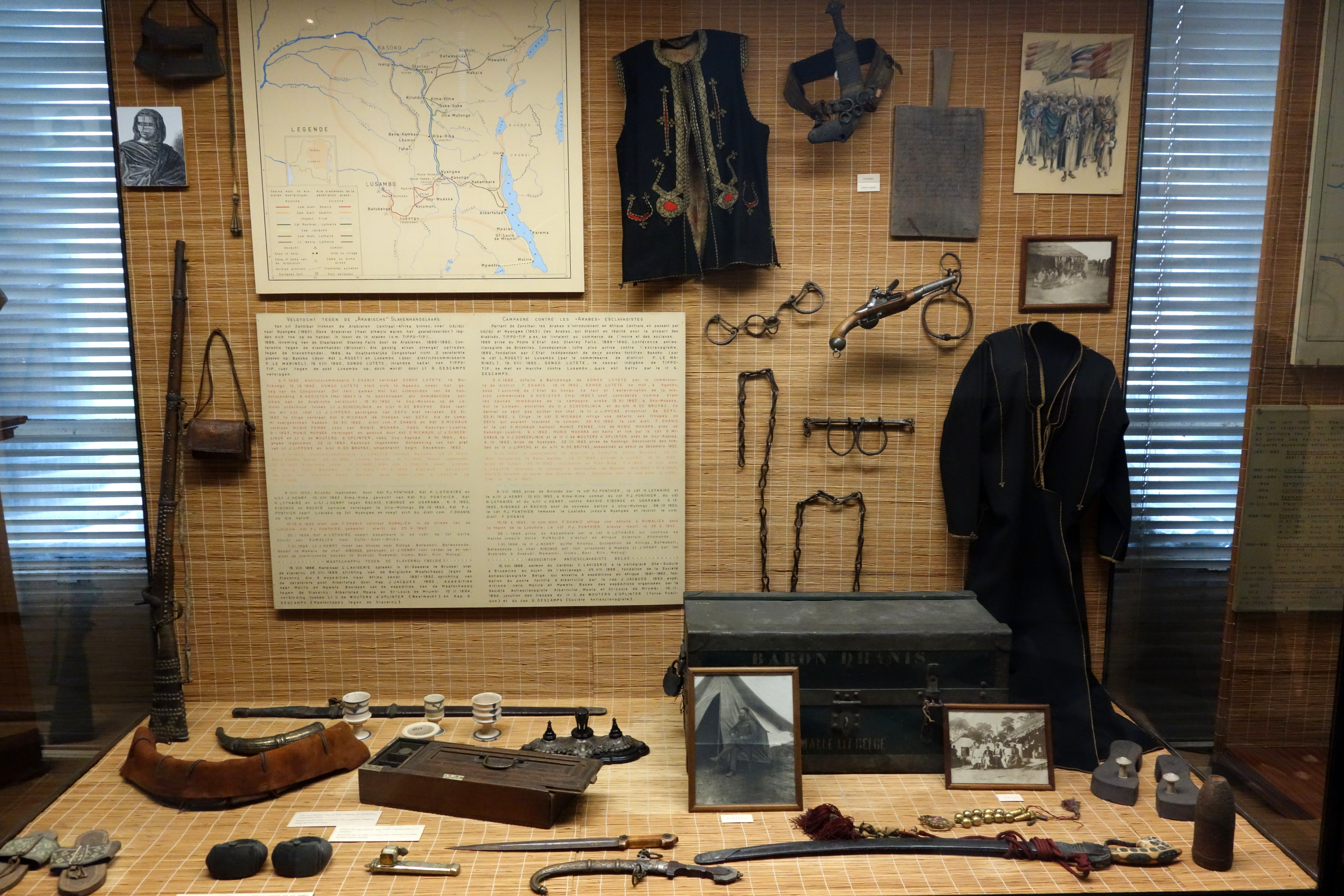
Display of artifacts from the Congo Arab war

By this time, the Congo Free State gained military strength in the region and became less tolerant of "Arab" strongmen, determined to stamp them out. The Congo Free State forces under Francis Dhanis launched a new campaign against the slave traders in 1892, and Rumaliza was one of the main targets.

By 1892, the Swahili slave and ivory trader Rumaliza dominated Tanganyika from his base at Ujiji on the old slave route that led from Stanley Falls up the Lualaba River to Nyangwe, east to Lake Tanganyika and then via Tabora to Bagamoyo opposite Zanzibar. The total number of Swahili fighters in this huge region numbered around 100,000, but each chief acted independently from the main body. Although experienced in warfare, they were poorly armed with simple rifles. The Belgians had just 600 troops divided between the Basoko and Lusambo camps, but were much better armed and had six cannons and a machine gun.

In the previous years (1886-1891), the Society of Missionaries of Africa founded Catholic missions at the north and south ends of Lake Tanganyika. Léopold Louis Joubert, a French soldier and armed auxiliary, was dispatched by Archbishop Charles Lavigerie's Society of Missionaries of Africa to protect the missionaries. The missionaries abandoned three of the new stations due to Tippu Tip's and Rumaliza's attacks. By 1891, the slavers had control of the lake's entire western shore, apart from the region defended by Joubert around Mpala and St Louis de Mrumbi. The anti-slavery expedition under Captain Alphonse Jacques—financed by the Belgian Anti-Slavery Society—came to the relief of Joubert on 30 October 1891. When the Jacques expedition arrived, Joubert's garrison was down to about 200 men, poorly armed with "a most miscellaneous assortment of Chassepots, Remingtons and muzzle-loaders, without suitable cartridges." He also had hardly any medicine left. Captain Jacques asked Joubert to remain on the defensive while his expedition moved north.

On 3 January 1892, Captain Alphonse Jacques' anti-slavery expedition founded the Albertville fortress on Lake Tanganyika's shores, and tried to end the slave trade in the region. Rumaliza's troops surrounded Albertville on 5 April and besieged the outpost for 9 months. Eventually, Rumaliza's forces had to retreat because of the arrival of the Long-Duvivier-Demol Anti-Slavery expedition, a relief column sent from Brussels at captain Alphonse Jacques's aide.

=== The capture of Nyangwe and Kasongo ===
On 28 January 1893, Congo Free State forces reached the western bank of the Lualaba River opposite the city of Nyangwe, a major trading port for slaves and ivory in the region. The forces made no attempt to cross and instead established a camp on their side of the river, though over subsequent weeks they occasionally fired musket rounds at the city. On 4 March, the Free State forces crossed the river using 100 dugout canoes piloted by Genia fisherman. Surprised by the crossing, the Arab defenders and their allies in the city fled, allowing it to fall largely without resistance. Free State forces established a fortified position in an elevated area in the city. On 13 March, residents in Nyangwe revolted. The Free State troops defeated the insurrection and, out of fear of further unrest, set most of the city ablaze. The majority of Free States forces left on 17 April. Free State Army Captain Sidney Langford Hinde wrote that by the time the troops departed, the city "had been reduced from a well-built town of about thirty thousand inhabitants to one large fortified house with a soldiers' camp around it."

With Nyangwe secured, the Free State forces focused on capturing Kasongo. Tippu Tip's capital in Maniema, the city was 35 miles south of Nyangwe and regularly hosted 20,000 residents, but the population had tripled due to an influx of refugees from Nyangwe as well as troops led by Said bin Abed and Muhammad bin Amici. Having never anticipated that Kasongo would be threatened, Sefu's lieutenants hurriedly worked to organise defences. Dhanis advanced up the river to Kasongo on 22 April 1893, while sending Lieutenant Doorme and his advanced guard to encircle the city. Caught between the Free State troops, the Arab defenders as well as civilians and slaves fled the city, letting it fall to their attackers in two hours. The Force Publique found a large supply store at Kasongo, including ivory, ammunition, food and luxuries such as sugar, candles, gold, and crystal tableware. Sefu and the other Arab leaders escaped. For the next six months, Dhanis remained inactive, setting up supply routes and befriending the local tribes, while Rumaliza's forces were swelled by Swahili fighters who escaped earlier defeats by Dhanis.

=== Fight for the Stanley Falls ===
The steamer Ville-de-Bruxelles on the Congo River, 1890

In 1893, Louis-Napoléon Chaltin was head of the Force Publique station at Basoko—the camp at Basoko had been established by the Congo Free State as a precaution, in the event of a quarrel with the Arab slave and ivory traders at Stanley Falls. Captain Chaltin and Richard Mohun—a commercial agent for the United States and the commander of the artillery battery attached to this expedition—were ordered in May 1893 to join Captain Dhanis' forces near Kasongo. Chaltin went up the Lomami River to Bena-Kamba with two river steamers, then striking overland to Riba Riba, near present-day Kindu. At this point, smallpox had broken out in his caravan, and Chaltin was forced to return to Basoko. Chaltin arrived at Stanley Falls on 18 May, where Captain Tobback and Lieutenant Van Lint had for five days been resisting the attacks of the forces of Rashid ben Mohammed, the nephew of Tippu Tip. On the landing of the troops from Basoko at Stanley Falls, the Arab attackers decamped, leaving the town. After defeating them again at Kirundu, the Arab traders were expelled from the region. Chaltin went on to secure the Dungu region in the northeast of the Congo Free State, and was commander of the Haut-Uélé district from 1893.

On 25 June 1893, Commandant Pierre Ponthier arrived at the Stanley Falls from Europe. He immediately collected all the troops he could, took Captain Hubert Lothaire and some men from Bangala with him and followed the Arab units, who had fled from the Stanley Falls up the river. After some severe fighting and many skirmishes, he cleared the river and its neighbourhood, as far as Nyangwe. During a fortnight's severe fighting, Commandant Ponthier's attacks on the forts of Rumaliza failed, and Ponthier was killed in action.

=== Rumaliza's last stand ===
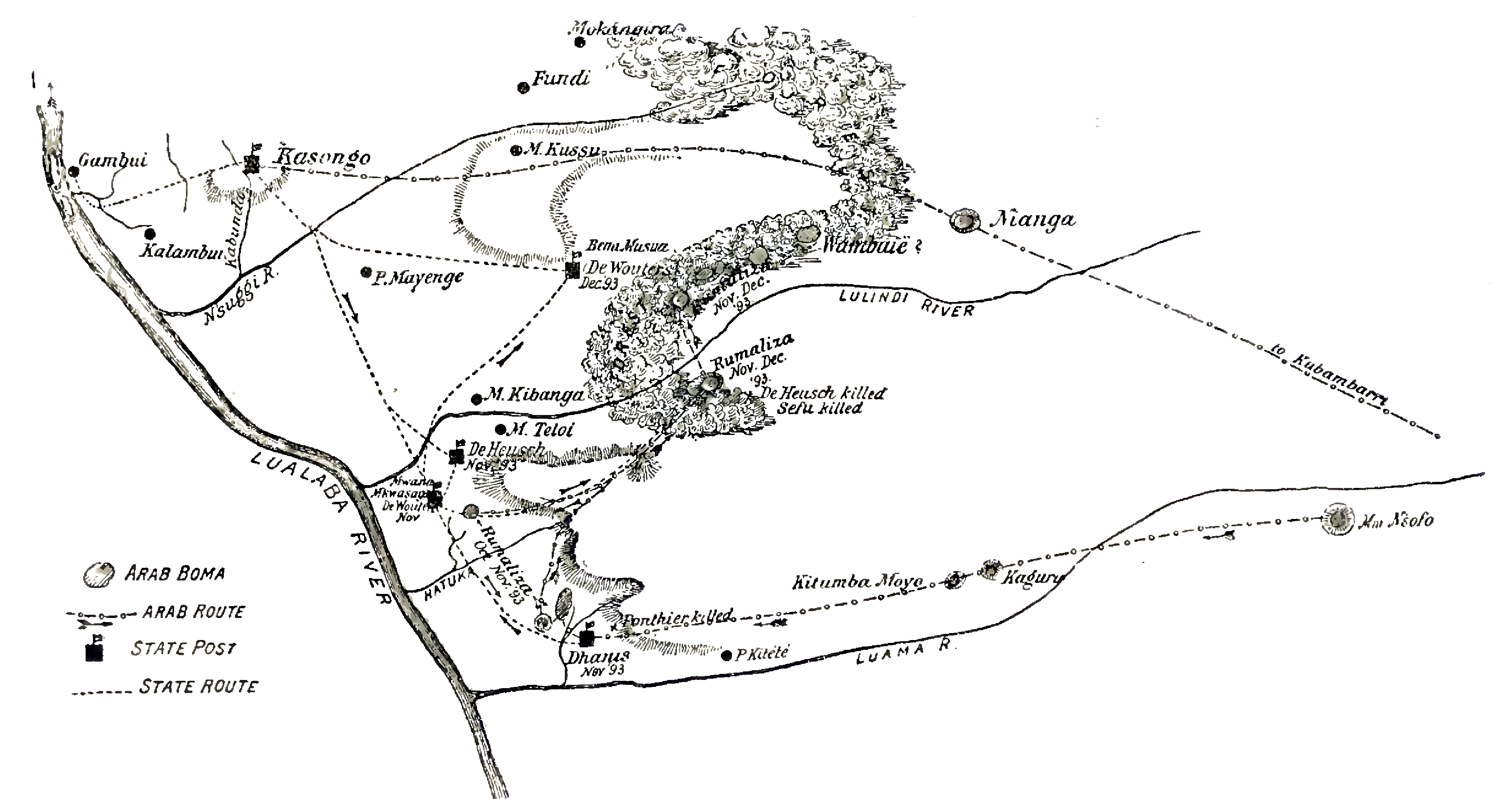
Attack on Rumaliza's fort, 1893

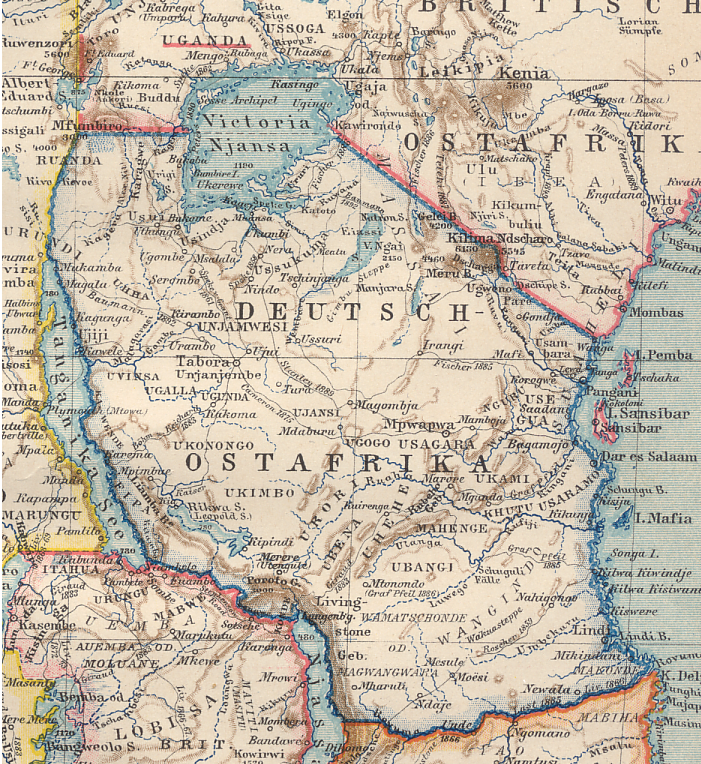
German East Africa, 1894. Albertville, Marungu (and Mpala) are to the west of the southern portion of Lake Tanganyika.

After the fall of Nyangwe and Kasongo, Rumaliza, the Arab leader of Ujiji, brought a large army from the Lake Tanganyika region to Kabambare to retake the Arabs' lost ground. His troops then advanced towards the Lualaba River and erected forts south of Kasongo to threaten the Free State's control over the city. Rumaliza's force clashed with Dhanis' column on 15 October 1893, causing the death of two European leaders and 50 of their soldiers. On 19 October 1893, Rumaliza attacked a position one day's march from Kasongo. Dhanis concentrated his forces and defeated Rumaliza.

The war's last major battle occurred on 20 October 1893, on the Luama River, west of Lake Tanganyika. It was a tactical stalemate, but Sefu was killed, and the remaining resistance soon disintegrated. By 24 December 1893, Dhanis obtained reinforcements and was ready to advance again. Rumaliza had also received assistance. Dhanis sent one column under Gillain to prevent Rumaliza's retreat, and another under De Wouters to advance on Rumaliza's fort near Bena Kalunga. A group of fresh forces coming to Rumaliza's aid from German East Africa was headed off, and Dhanis's forces closed in on Rumaliza's bomas (Swahili for fort). On 9 January 1894, Belgian reinforcements arrived under Captain Hubert Lothaire, and the same day a shell blew up Rumaliza's ammunition store and burned down the fort containing it. Most of the occupants were killed while attempting to escape. Within three days, the remaining forts, cut off from water and other supplies, surrendered. More than two thousand prisoners were taken.

A column under Lothaire pursued him to the north of Lake Tanganyika, destroying his fortified positions along the route, although Rumaliza himself managed to escape. At the lake, they joined with the anti-slavery expedition led by Captain Alphonse Jacques Rumaliza took refuge in the German colony of German East Africa. By the end of February, Rumaliza had been defeated, but the war continued into October, with remaining Zanzibari forces under Said Bin Al-Abedi fleeing into the Ituri forest, being pursued by the Belgians, were they continued to received arms shipments. They had continued to hold off Belgian forces until a force was sent to the region, when they were defeated and captured. The Zanzibari force had attempted to flee into German East Africa, but in December 1894, they were captured, and all of them were executed including Charles Stokes.

== Aftermath and impact ==
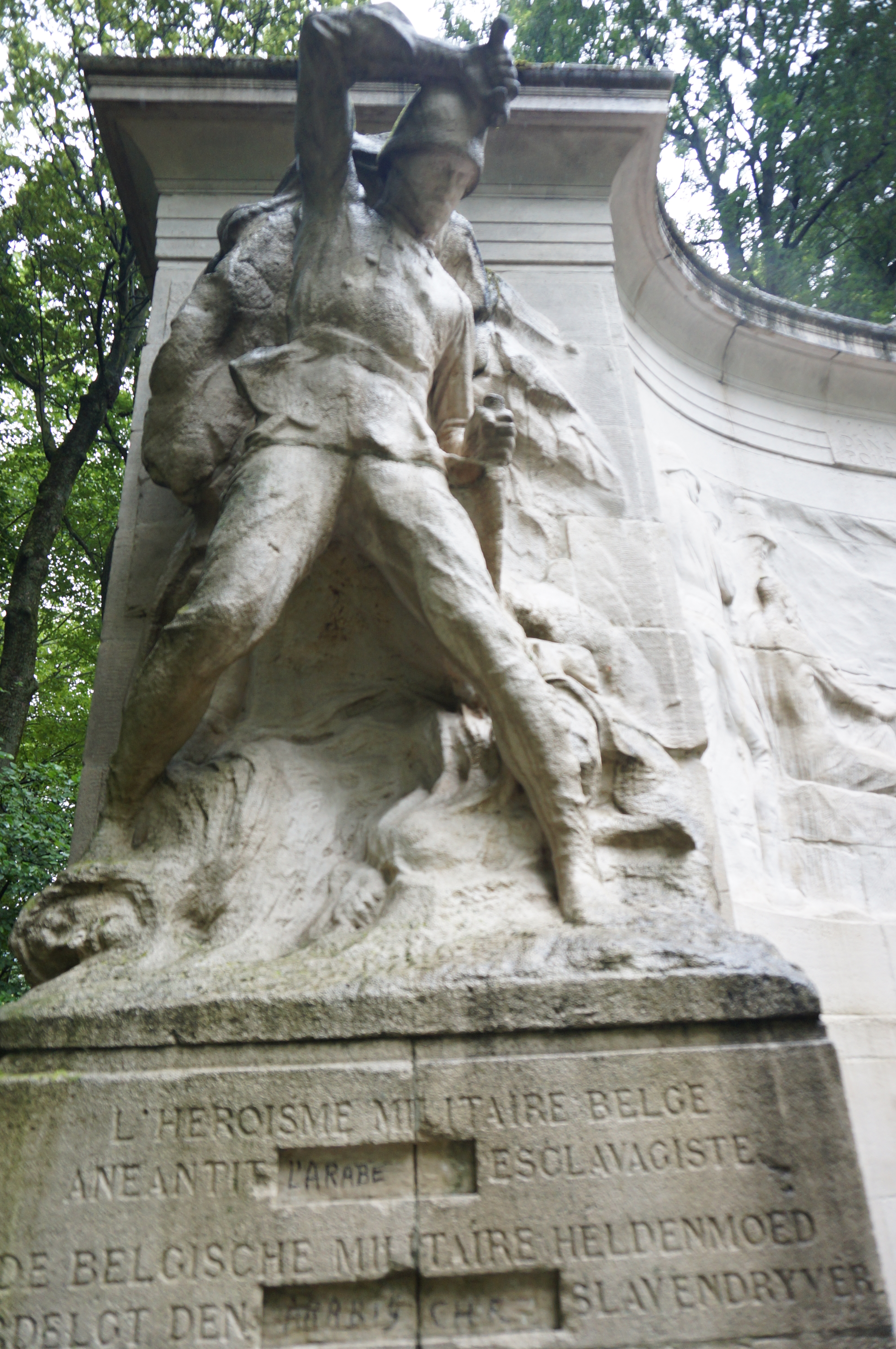
Belgian military heroism wipes out the (Arab) slave trader, (modified) inscription on the Monument to the Belgian Pioneers in Congo in Cinquantenaire Park, Brussels

The war resulted in tens of thousands of deaths among both combatants and civilians, and significantly altered the political and economic geography of the Congo. The market around Nyangwe ceased to exist, while the city of Kasongo was all but destroyed. With the absence of these markets and the Arab traders themselves, much of Congo's exports were rerouted from their destinations in East Africa to the Stanley Pool and the Atlantic Ocean. The colonial authorities retained much of the Arab administrative structure in the eastern Congo until the 1920s. The participation of the Batetela and Bakusu tribes in the war marked the transcendence of their societies' traditional values by desires for wealth and power through expansionism, assimilation, and cultural exchange. Their involvement in the slave trade made Belgian authorities wary of them, and in turn, they were neglected during colonial rule.

The war has generally received little academic attention. According to historian Bruce Vandervort, the conflict was "one of the most obscure of the wars of imperial conquest in Africa."

== See also ==
- Batetela rebellion
- Battle of Rejaf
- Cannibalism in Africa § Congo Basin
- Léon Rom
- Mahdist War
- Richard Mohun
