= Belgian Anti-Slavery Society =

Belgian organization

The Belgian Anti-Slavery Society (French: Société antiesclavagiste de Belgique, Dutch: Antislavernijmaatschappij van België) was a 19th-century organization, with the goal of putting an end to the Indian Ocean slave trade in the African continent. The Belgian Anti-Slavery Society was founded in 1888, mainly by catholic intellectuals, led by count Hippolyte d'Ursel. The founders were inspired by the preaching of Charles Lavigerie, a French Cardinal, held at the Cathedral of St. Michael and St. Gudula in August 1888. By January 1889 the society counted 700 members and had a working capital of 300.000 francs at its disposal. The abolitionist ideology of the Anti-Slavery Society was, however, closely linked with imperialism. From 1890 to 1899 the Société antiesclavagiste de Belgique organized and funded four military expeditions, sent to fight the Arab/Zanzibari slavers of the eastern Congo Free State regions.

== Belgian anti-slavery expeditions ==
- 1890-92: Hinck-Van de Kerckhoven-Ectors Expedition, on the Congo and Lomami River, early setbacks led to a premature end of the expedition.
- 1891-92: Alphonse Jacques de Dixmude-Storms-Docquier-Renier-Vrithoff, founded Albertville (Kalemie) and fought Rumaliza in the eastern Congo region .
- 1892-93: Long-Duvivier-Demol expedition, launched their expedition from the Indian Ocean and came to the aid of the Jacques and Docquier expedition, managed to end hostilities directed at Albertville.
- 1893-96: Descamps-Miot-Chargois expedition, followed the Zambezi upstream and cooperated with Jacques, Dhanis and Wouters. After the defeat of the Zanzibari slavers during the Congo Arab war by the Congo Free State, the Descamps expedition fought against the last pockets of slave traders resistance in the area.

== Brussels Anti-Slavery Conference 1889–1890 ==
The Belgian Anti-Slavery Society published the journal Le mouvement antiesclavagiste (redaction by Louis Delmer), in 1899 it merged with the Oeuvre des Missions Catholiques au Congo. The society was also a close supporter of the internationally attended Brussels Anti-Slavery Conference 1889–90 which eventually led to the Brussels Conference Act of 1890. They also organized a follow-up conference at the Academy Palace to put pressure on the countries that had rejected the anti-slavery act thus far, mainly the Netherlands and the Ottoman Empire.

== See also ==
- Congo Arab war
- Congo Free State
- Brussels Anti-Slavery Conference 1889–90
