= Gongo Lutete =

Tetela leader and chieftain

Ngongo Lutete (or Gongo Lutete or Ngongo Leteta) was a Tetela leader and chieftain during the late 19th century.

== Biography ==
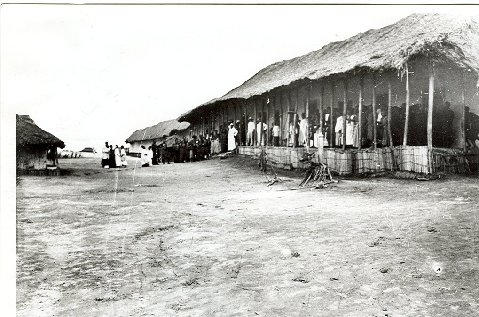
Residence of Ngongo Lutete at Ngandu (1893)

As a boy Ngongo Lutete was enslaved by Arabs, but after winning his freedom he became a respected leader of the Watetera & Kilembwe people in Maniema. Ngongo Lutete gained control of the region around Ngandu on the upper Lomami River. In 1886, he joined forces with the Arab slave trader Tippu Tip near Stanley Falls, where Tip was organizing resistance to Leopold II's Congo Free State. On his expedition to Katanga, Alexandre Delcommune was given a magnificent reception at Ngandu by Ngongo between 2 May and 18 May 1891.

When the Congo Arab war began, Ngongo Lutete and his people fought for the Arabs initially, under the command of Tippu Tip's son Sefu bin Hamid. However, the Arabs failed to pay Lutete for his allegiance and also for some ivory which he had provided for them. After losing a series of engagements with Francis Dhanis, late in 1892 he changed sides and was accepted as an ally by the Belgians. This infuriated Sefu, who sent the Free State a message demanding that they surrender Lutete to him and threatening to drive his forces all the way to Stanleyville in the western Congo if they did not comply.

Ngongo Lutete fought for the Free State until September 1893, when he was accused of plotting to betray the Free State and executed. Lutete was executed after a drumhead court-martial chaired by a young Belgian lieutenant at which no credible evidence was presented. One story says that Ngongo had had his lieutenant, a Songye, killed for some offense. Other Songyes complained to the whites, presumably convincing them of treachery. The story went on to say that the whites tied Ngongo up and fired at him all day without injuring him. It was only when they removed his amulets and fired into his ear, as directed by his Luba magician, that the spirits who had been protected him left and he died. The soldiers he had brought over to the Belgians considered the trial a miscarriage of justice, and anger over the execution contributed to the Batetela rebellion, which broke out two years later.

The followers of Lutete were described as Luba, Songye, and Kusu.

== Sources ==
- de Heusch, Luc (1996). Objects: signs of Africa. Snoeck-Ducaju & Zoon.
- Edgerton, Robert B. (2002). The Troubled Heart of Africa: A History of the Congo. New York: St. Martin's Press. p. 94. ISBN 0-312-30486-2.
- Ewans, Martin (2002). European atrocity, African catastrophe: Leopold II, the Congo Free State and its aftermath. Routledge. ISBN 0-7007-1589-4.
- Johnston, Harry H. (2011). A History of the Colonization of Africa by Alien Races. Cambridge University Press. ISBN 978-0-521-23128-2.
- Turner, Thomas (2007). The Congo wars: conflict, myth and reality. Zed Books. ISBN 978-1-84277-689-6.
- Hinde, Sidney Langford (1 January 1897). The Fall of the Congo Arabs. Methuen & Company – via archive.org.
