= Jules Jacques de Dixmude =

Belgian Army general

Lieutenant-general Jules Jacques de Dixmude "Général Jacques" GC O. Leopold, Comm. O. Crown, GCMG
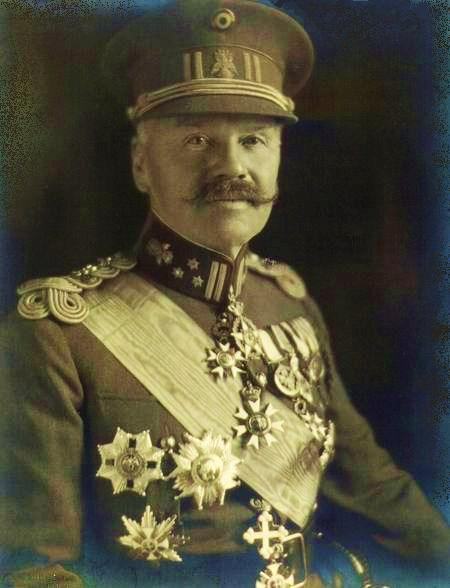
- Born: Jules Marie Alphonse Jacques; 24 February 1858; Stavelot, Belgium
- Died: 24 November 1928 (aged 70); Ixelles, Belgium
- Military career
- Allegiance: Belgium; Congo Free State
- Rank: Lieutenant General
- Commands: 12th Regiment of the Line; 3rd Infantry Division
- Conflicts: Congo-Arab War; World War I: Battle of the Yser

Lieutenant-general Baron Jules Marie Alphonse Jacques de Dixmude (24 February 1858 – 24 November 1928), often known as General Jacques, was a Belgian military figure of World War I and colonial advocate.

== Congo Free State ==
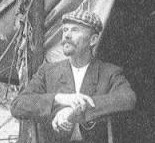
Alphonse Jacques in the Congo, 1903

He founded Albertville (Kalemie) in the Congo in 1892.

Jacques was known for contributing to the brutality of the Congo Free State rule. After hearing that native Congolese forced laborers were severing vines instead of tapping them as ordered, he wrote to one of his subordinates: "Decidedly these people of [Inongo] are a bad lot. They have just been and cut some rubber vines...We must fight them until their absolute submission has been obtained, or their complete extermination...Inform the natives that if they cut another single vine, I will exterminate them to the last man."

== Military career ==
=== Congo Arab war ===
From 1886 to 1892, the Society of Missionaries of Africa had founded Catholic missions at the north and south ends of Lake Tanganyika. Léopold Louis Joubert, a French soldier and armed auxiliary, was dispatched by Archbishop Charles Lavigerie's Society of Missionaries of Africa to protect the missionaries. The missionaries abandoned three of the new stations due to attacks by Tippu Tip and Rumaliza. By 1891 the Zanzibari slavers had control of the entire western shore of the lake, apart from the region defended by Joubert around Mpala and St Louis de Mrumbi. The anti-slavery expedition under captain Jacques—financed by the Belgian Anti-Slavery Society—came to the relief of Joubert on 30 October 1892. When the Jacques expedition arrived Joubert's garrison was down to about two hundred men, poorly armed with "a most miscellaneous assortment of chassepots, Remingtons and muzzle-loaders, without suitable cartridges". He also had hardly any medicine left. Captain Jacques asked Joubert to remain on the defensive while his expedition moved north. On 3 January 1892, captain Jacques' anti-slavery expedition founded the fortress of Albertville on the shores of Lake Tanganyika, and tried to put an end to the slave trade in the region. Rumaliza's troops surrounded Albertville on 5 April and besieged the outpost for 9 months. Eventually Rumaliza's forces had to retreat because of the arrival of the Long-Duvivier-Demol Anti-Slavery expedition, a relief column sent from Brussels at captain Jacques's aide. In 1894 he returns to Belgium, he serves as a colonial official in the Congo Free State from 1895 to 1898 and finally returns to the Congo Free State in 1902 to work on the railway line that connects Bas-Congo to Katanga.

=== World War I ===
Jacques was promoted to major in the Belgian army in 1908, lieutenant colonel in 1913 and colonel in 1914 as he took command of the 12th regiment. He obtained the rank of major general in 1915 and became a three-star general in 1916, taking command of the 3rd Army division. Because of his exceptional service during World War I, he was made Baron and received several decorations.

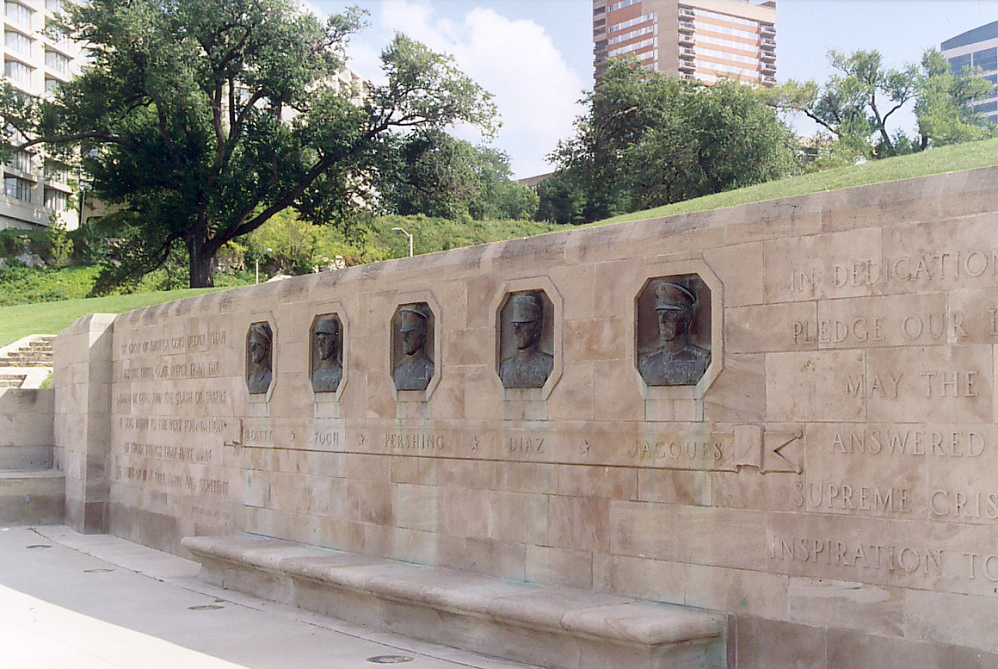
Kansas City Liberty Memorial. Left to right: Beatty, Foch, Pershing, Diaz and Jacques reliefs.

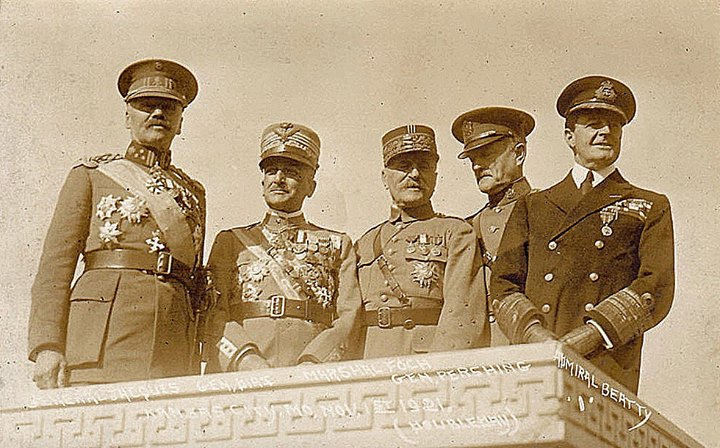
Generals of WWI: Alphonse Jacques de Dixmude, Armando Diaz, Ferdinand Foch, John Joseph "Black Jack" Pershing, David Beatty.

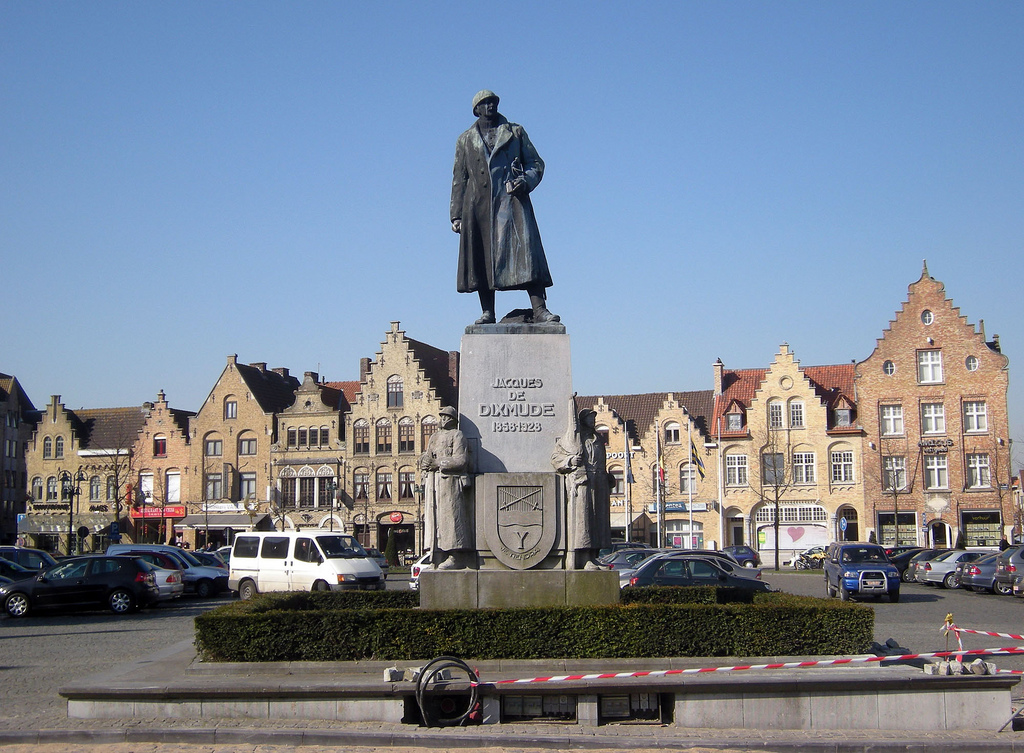
Statue of Jules Jacques de Dixmude in center of Diksmuide. His coat of arms is shown at the base.

== Title, honours and arms ==
Jacques was promoted to the rank of lieutenant general in 1916 and was made a baron in 1919 by HM King Albert I. In 1924 he was allowed to add "de Dixmude" to his last name.

=== Military awards and decorations ===

- Grand cordon of the order of Leopold with palm
- Commander of the order of the African star
- Commander of the order of the crown
- Knight of the royal order of the lion
- War cross WWI with palm
- Yser medal
- WWI Victory medal
- WW I commemorative medal
- The Arab campaign medal
- Military cross, first class
- Service star
- Commemorative medal of the reign of King Leopold II
- Knight grand cross of the order of St Michael and St George
- Grand cross of the order of St Anne (Russia)
- Knight grand cross of the order of the star of Karađorđe with swords (Serbia)
- Grand officer of the legion of honor (France)
- Commander of the order saints Maurice and Lazarus (Italy)
- Silver medal for military valor (Italy)
- Distinguished service medal (United States)
- War cross with palm (France)
- 8 front bars
- 1 wound bar

=== Commemoration ===
"General Jacques" is commemorated by several streets, statues, and monuments around Belgium, including the "Boulevard Général Jacques" in Brussels as well as others in Nivelles, Chaudfontaine and Verviers and numerous statues. A bas-relief of Baron Jacques is included as part of the Liberty Memorial in Kansas City.

=== Arms ===
Coat of arms of the Jacques de Dixmude family
sans_cadre sans_cadre	Coronet A Belgian Baron's coronet (for himself and all descendants holders of the title) Escutcheon Gules, a fess wavy Argent, accompanied in chief of two swords Argent hilt and pomel Or saltirewise, and in base the letter Y Or (French: De gueules à la fasce ondée d’argent, accompagnée en chef de deux épées d’argent garnies d’or, passées en sautoir, et en pointe de la lettre Y d’or.) Motto Je tiendrai (French for I will hold) Other elements In French: l’écu surmonté, pour le titulaire et pour ceux de ses descendants qui seront appelés à porter après lui le titre que Nous lui accordons, d’une couronne de baron, et tenu par deux chevaliers d’argent, à la figure de carnation, armés de toutes pièces, la visière levée, ceints d’une épée d’argent garnie d’or, et tenant, celui de dextre un bouclier fascé d’or et d’azur de huit pièces, qui sont les armoiries de Dixmude, et à senestre un bouclier échiqueté d’argent et d’azur, qui sont les armoiries de Merckem, l’écu surmonté, pour ses autres descendants d’un heaume d’argent couronné, grillé, colleté et liseré d’or, doublé et attaché de gueules, aux lambrequins d’or et de gueules, cimier : un chevalier armé comme les tenants issant, ayant dans la dextre une lance d’or à la pointe d’argent ornée d’une banderolle tiercée en pal de sable, d’or et de gueules.
