= Fort de Shinkakasa =

Former fort in the Belgian Congo

- 1.5 kilometres (0.93 mi) west of Boma, Democratic Republic of the Congo
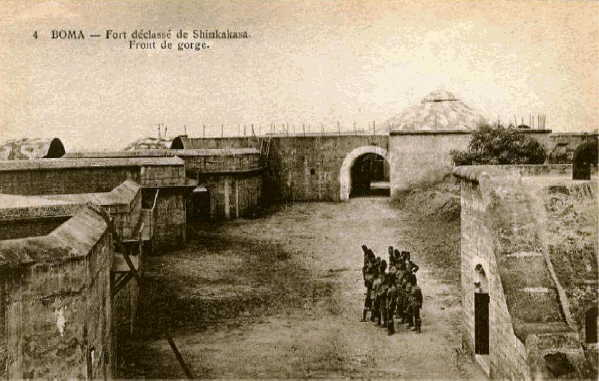

Location
- Coordinates: 5°51′25″S 13°01′58″E

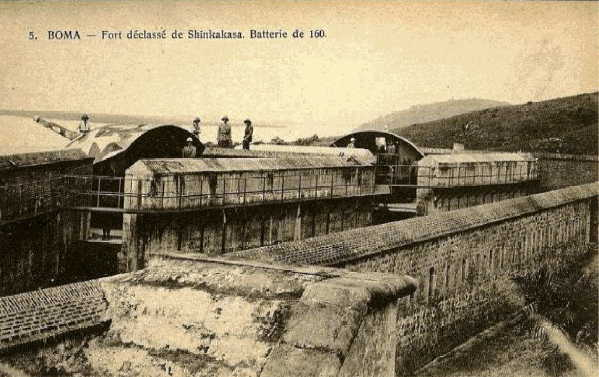
Rear view of the main gun battery at Shinkakasa

The Fort de Shinkakasa, also called Fort Boma, was a fortification built in the Congo Free State to defend access to the Congo river in 1891. It is located about 1.5 kilometres (0.93 mi) west of Boma which was the capital of the Free State and later the Belgian Congo from 1886 to 1926.

The fort was designed in a two-sided arrow shape by the Belgian engineer Émile Wangermée who had studied fortress design under the noted Belgian military architect Henri Alexis Brialmont. It was built by the Congo Free State to control access to the river, particularly against the Portuguese who occupied nearby Angola and Cabinda and which it was feared might cut off the Congo Free State from access to the Atlantic Ocean. In fact, the confrontation between the two nations were in fact limited to exchanges of fire between light batteries and Portuguese ships.

About two hundred soldiers of the Compagnie d'Artillerie et de Génie (Artillery and Engineers Company) from the Force Publique manned the fort's eight 160 millimetres (6.3 in) ship guns. In case of emergency, they were supported by local auxiliaries.

Troops of various tribes were assembled there to prevent impending mutinies. They were principally from distant regions to counter any rebellion, such as the Batetela rebellion of 1885–87. A major mutiny nonetheless occurred among Tetela soldiers in the fort on 17 April 1900.

== Bibliography ==
- Simon, Eric, Le Fort de Shinkakasa, Bulletin d'information du CLHAM (Centre liégeois d'histoire et d'archéologie militaires), vol X, no. 10, April–June 2009, ISSN 0771-3673
- Bekers, W.; Fivez, R. (2019). "The Visual, the Accidental and the Actual in the Historiography of the Fort of Shinkakasa, Democratic Republic of Congo, 1891-1909". Water, Doors, and Buildings: Studies in the History of Construction. Proceedings of the Sixth Conference of the Construction History Society. Queen's College, Cambridge, 5-7 April 2019. Construction History Society. pp. 392–406. ISBN 978-0-9928751-5-2.
