= Batetela rebellion =

Rebellion in the Congo Free State

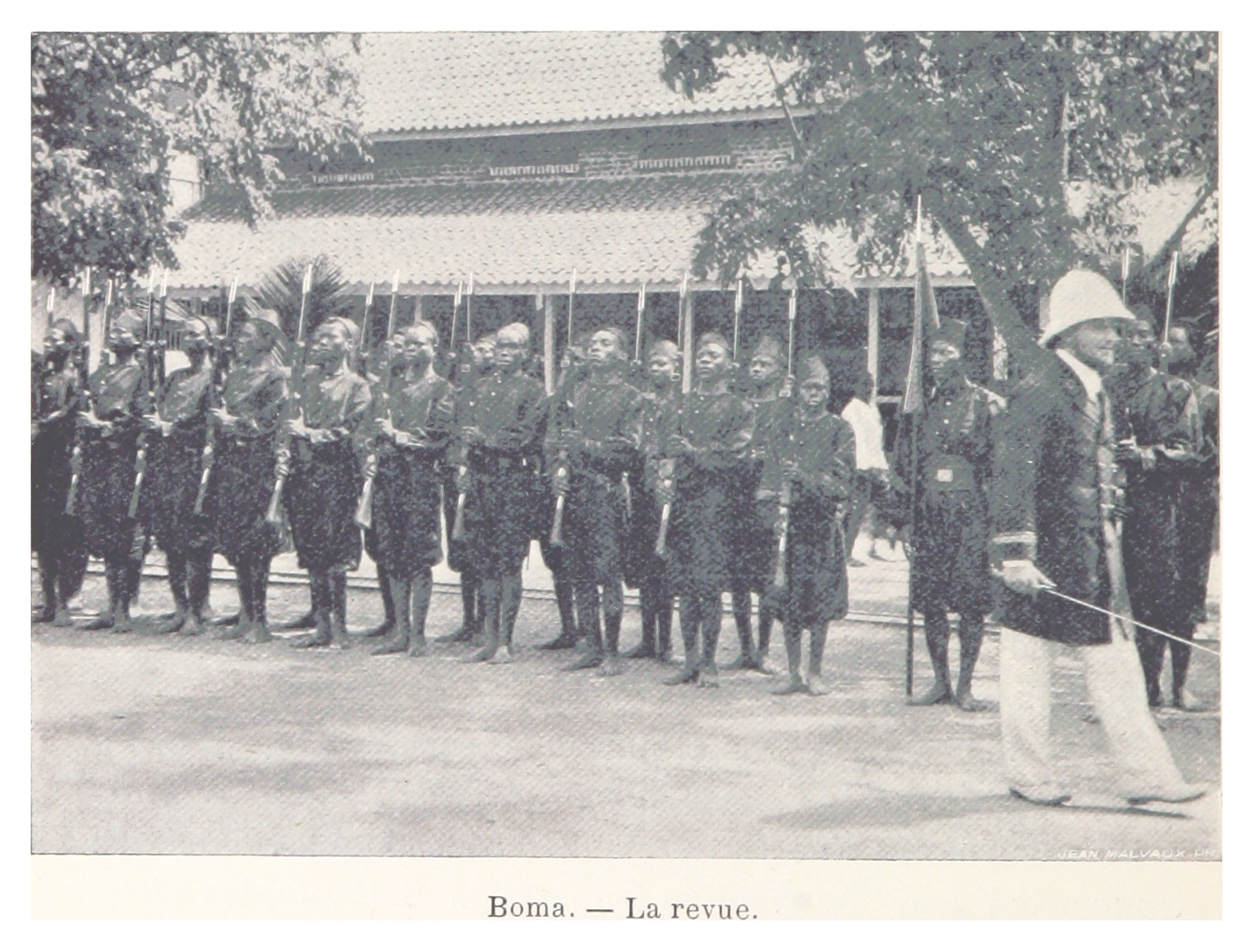
Soldiers of the Force Publique, pictured at Boma in 1899

The Batetela rebellion (Note: In most Bantu languages, the prefix ba- is added to a human noun to form a plural. As such, Batetela refers collectively to members of what early colonial occupiers interpreted as being Tetela ethnic group.) (French: Révolte des Batetela) was a series of three military mutinies and a subsequent low-level insurgency which was attributed to members of the Tetela ethnic group in the Congo Free State between 1895 and 1908.

Beginning in a mutiny among Tetela troops of the Force Publique of Luluabourg (modern-day Kananga) in January 1895, the revolt sparked a prolonged insurgency and two further mutinies subsequently took place elsewhere in the Congo. The second rebellion occurred among the troops serving in the military expedition under Francis Dhanis to the Upper Nile in 1897. The third and final mutiny took place among the garrison of Fort de Shinkakasa near Boma in April 1900.

The rebellion was one of the most important anti-colonial rebellions in the history of the Congo and the last Tetela rebels were only defeated in 1901.

== Mutinies ==
Map of the Congo Free State

The Force Publique recruited heavily from the Tetela ethnic group in the Sankuru, Maniema and Lomami regions, especially during the Congo Arab war (1892–1894).

=== Luluabourg mutiny of 1895 ===
In January 1895, the garrison of Luluabourg mutinied in response to the execution of the warlord Gongo Lutete for treachery during the war against the Arabs. In October 1896, there were approximately 3,000–4,000 Batetela rebels. The mutineers killed one of their white officers and escaped, being joined by Tetela soldiers from across the colony over the coming years.

=== Dhanis expedition mutiny of 1897 ===
1,300 troops from the Tetela and Kusu ethnic groups in an expeditionary force sent to the Upper Nile in 1897 under the command of Baron Francis Dhanis mutinied, complaining of poor treatment.

The force, the largest military force assembled in colonial Africa up to that point, had been sent to annex the Fashoda region in the collapsing Mahdist State in Sudan (modern-day Kodok, South Sudan). The expedition's collapse as a result of the mutiny meant that the Free State would ultimately avoid becoming a party in Anglo-French confrontation in the Fashoda Incident.

The mutineers killed 10 Belgian officers and took a French priest hostage, though he was ultimately released unharmed.

=== Shinkakasa mutiny of 1900 ===
The third rebellion broke out in the garrison of Fort de Shinkakasa on the Congo River on 17 April 1900. The rebels gained control of the fort and opened fire on a moored ship and threatened the safety of the colonial capital, Boma. Despite being repeatedly defeated, the last Tetela mutineers held out around Lake Kisale until 1901 or 1908. After the conflict the Belgians reformed the Force Publique so that no single ethnic group represented a majority in any given unit.

== Bibliography ==
- Crawford Young, M. (1965). Politics in Congo: Decolonization and Independence. Oxford: Oxford University Press.
- Gann, Lewis H.; Duignan, Peter (1979). The Rulers of Belgian Africa, 1884–1914. Princeton: Princeton University Press. ISBN 9780691052779.
- Legum, Colin (1961). Congo Disaster. Penguin.
- Renton, David; Seddon, David; Zeilig, Leo (2007). The Congo: Plunder and Resistance. London: Zed Books. ISBN 978-1-84277-485-4.
