= Tetela people =

Ethnic group in the DR Congo

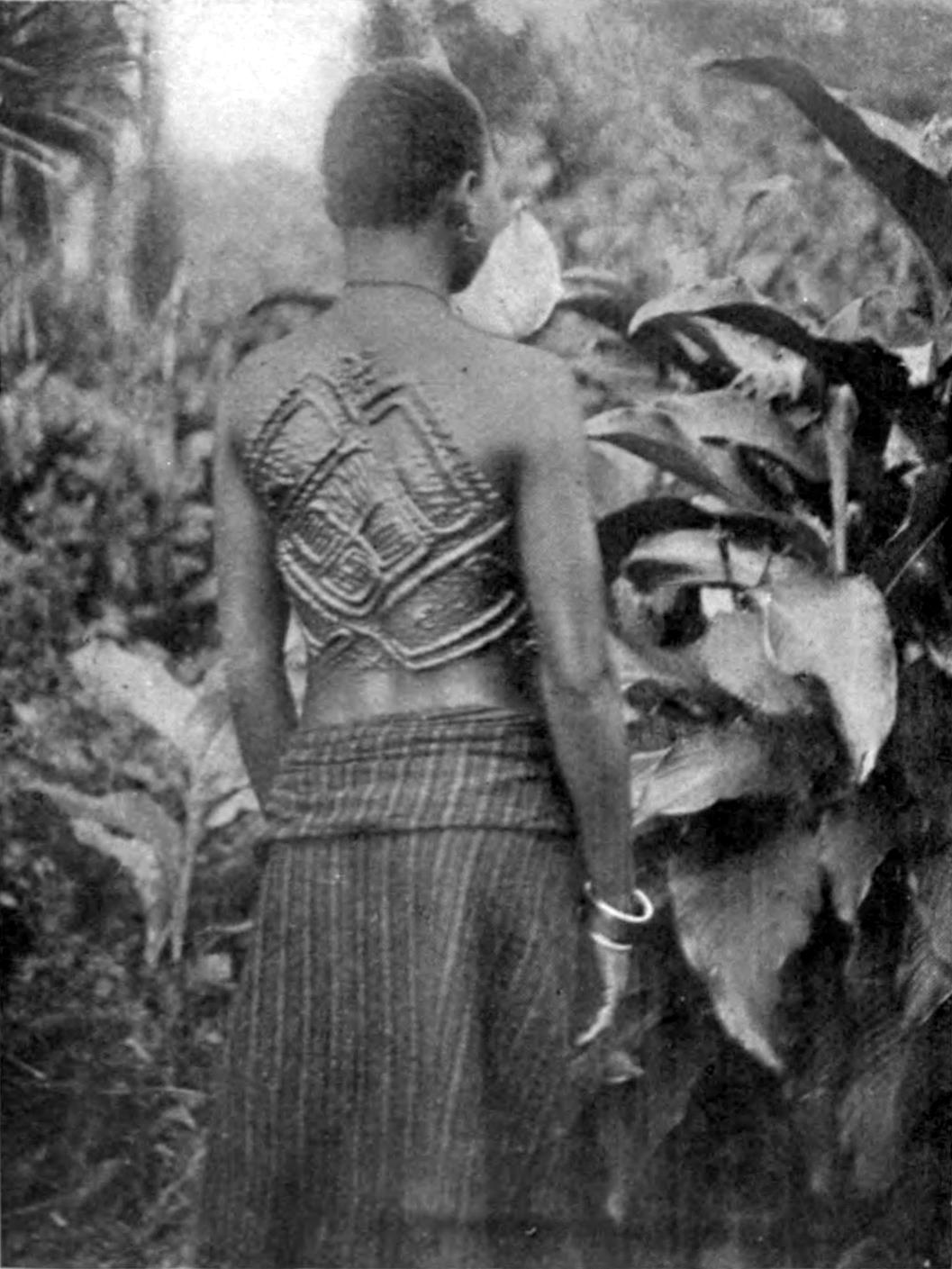
- Cicatrised Tetela woman in Maniema, c.1905

Total population
- 750.000

Regions with significant populations

Languages
- Tetela language

Related ethnic groups
- Mongo, Kusu Anamongo

The indigenous people within the Kasai Basin up to Maniema understood themselves to be descendants of "AnKutshu Membele", then in the 20th century many accepted the colonially imposed category and term Tetela (or Batetela in the plural). "Batetela" is now understood as an ethnic group of the Democratic Republic of the Congo, most of whom speak the Tetela language.

== Description ==
"Batetela" as a clan or tribe did not exist. Only between 1885 and 1887 are the first public geographical journals, notes and books reporting a people named "Batetela". Missionaries were reporting all people speaking languages akin to today's "Kitetela" or culturally similar people as "Batetela" despite the name "Batetela" evolving from the term "Watetera" in reference to bilingual communities from the 1870s Barua lands(Baluba lands in Maniema).

This term "Batetela" was either a corruption or mistranslation off the mid- to late 19th-century term known as "Watetera" which was used to describe the people from this region which Arab slave traders termed "Utotera".

The place Utotera was located in present-day "Maniema" within today's eastern DR Congo, consisting of bilingual populations who today can be identified as "Songye" or "Luba" and "Kusu".

According to Emil Torday a "tetela speaking" group bearing the Luba title "Sungu" claimed the name "Batetela" was given to them by the Arabs.

The chief of the Watetera was a Luba or Songye man named Kasongo Lushie and his Watetera were a collective of people from his ethnicity, which included subjects then referred to as "Wakussu", who in historical archives can be identified today as "Songye", or "Luba" and "Tetela"(Kusu).

The "Wakussu" from the Barua (baluba lands) lands in Maniema were sometimes collectively referred to as "Manyema" if not "Watetera".

The Luba, Songye and bilingual, Kitetela speakers from the 1870s Barua lands (Baluba Lands)in Maniema had a custom of wearing parrot feathers. When the Arab slave traders witnessed this they began to refer to them as "Kusu" (Wakussu) people which is a corruption of the word "Kasuku", which means parrot.

The term Kusu had since developed to the point, of removing the original, Songye or Luba populations off "Watetera", except the "Kitetela" speakers off maniema who today maintain the name "Kusu".

In 1910, the Methodist Episcopal Church South established a church mission in Wembo-Nyama identifying their work with the "Otetela" people. Daniel and Edith Mumpower began to record and document the Otetela language starting in 1914.

Indigenous people off Maniema to Sankuru who reported themselves as descendants of AnKutshu or AnKutshu-membele (not to be confused with "Kusu") had indirectly and directly accepted the new reported and imposed label "Tetela" as an ethnic label in the early 20th century, which began to apply to all across the northern kasai basin up to Maniema irrespective of their original family names.

In the late 19th century a group of Watetera people bearing the Luba title "Sungu" had placed themselves within the southern areas in today's sankuru district where the term Batetela was used first to describe the "Sungu" but then later imposed on the indigenous forest populations and others who initially understood themselves to be descendants of AnKutshu or AnKutshu membele.

According to Emil Torday the term "Batetela was not in general use", which supports the term "Batetela" being a 20th-century application, unknown to the majority of the populations who later accepted this term as an ethnic category

Today the name "Batetela" is now accepted as the name for people living in the region between Lusambo and the Upper Congo River, in the provinces of Sankuru and Maniema. They live by hunting-gathering, fishing, farming, and raising cassava, bananas, and kola nuts. They are understood to be related to the then "Wakussu" people who remained in Maniema only separating from them in the late 1800s after the arrival of Arabs and Belgians in the region. Many understood as "Tetela" and some of today's Kusu are subgroups of the larger Mongo group. The Kusu people are concentrated between Kibombo and Lubao. In the mid to late 19th century they were under the rulership of the Kilembwe rulers and chief Kasongo Lushie where some came under the influence of Arab traders while the "Sungu" and other bilingual populations ventured inland towards the eastern section within the Kasai basin. At this period of time the term "Wakussu" was used to describe these bilingual populations, which included people who spoke a language known as "Binji" (A Songye language).

Some of these "Wakussu" groups were understood to be arabised, speaking Swahili and had adopted Islam. For example, a group of "Binji" speakers later referred to as "Zappo Zap" were reported to have been arabised. A notable person thought to have been from the Wakussu collective was Slave raider known as "Ngongo Lutete" who was also reported to have been arabised.

The late 19th century ethnic identifier for many of these arabised groups were "filled teeth" which was initially reported as a custom for "cannibals". Only later it was understood as a general custom not necessarily associated with cannibalism.

Belgian authorities in the early twenty century categorised "Kusu" as a people within today's Kivu Province and the term "Tetela" applying to any "Kitetela" speaking people in the Northern Kasai Province. According to Emil Torday he was told the name Motetela comes from a god named Motetela, meaning either "he who laughs not" or "he at whom one may not laugh", though this name was not known by the majority populations within the early 20th century and during this same period American missionaries discovered the original term to describe a Supreme deity in "Kitetela" was referred to as "Djungumanga". According to Emile Torday The people bearing the Luba title "Sungu" arrived in today's sankuru district with term "Winya" to describe god and not "motetela". From the early 20th century the term Winya to describe god evolved to Unya Shungu as the name for god, which allegedly meant father of heavens.

Tetela have a large and colorful set of proverbs that are used for a wide variety of purposes, from rebuking to encouraging, usually by adults.

== History ==
According to Emil Torday (who studied the tribes of the Congo between 1908 and 1909), the term Batetela was not in general use amongst all he referred to as Batetela. According to Emil Torday a specific people known as the "Sungu" (Sungu is a Luba title) told him the name "Batetela" was given to them by the Arabs. The Sungu originated on the right bank of the Lomami River and migrated to their present territory at some unknown date. In 1869–70, the term "Batetela" did not exist but groups known as "Watetera" came into contact with Tippu Tip, an Arab slave trader from Zanzibar. Following this, the chieftain Gongo Lutete began working with Tip and the Arabs to lead the Songye (who were once referred to as "Watetera)" in slave raids against other Songye & Tetela on the left bank of the Lomami river. According to Emil Torday the "Songye" are a Baluba sub tribe. Later reports from 1890 to 1894 claims Gongo Lutete, Pania Mutombo (Mutombo is a Luba name) and Lumpungu (Lumpungu is a Songye name) raided Luba people in Kasai. In the Congo Arab war of 1892–1894, the then Watetera who were later to be reported as Batetela defected to the Belgians to fight against the Arabs in the Congo Arab war. Gongo Lutete was executed by the Belgians in 1893, however, it has since been reported this caused the Batetela to revolt in 1895 in the first of the Batetela Rebellions. Followers of Gongo Lutete were discovered to be Songye, Luba & Tetela following the 1895 revolts in Luluabourg, Kasai-Occidental. Successive uprisings followed, lasting until 1908.

During the period immediately following independence, Patrice Lumumba, a Tetela, was a prominent politician and the first Prime Minister of the Democratic Republic of the Congo before his assassination in 1961. Researcher Ludo De Witte suggested that the geographic fragmentation of the Batetela throughout multiple Congolese provinces and their socio-economic dependence on the country as a whole was an important factor in the anti-tribalism and nationalism of figures such as Lumumba.

In 1975, many Batetela were purged from the military.

== Music ==
"Three types of drum are used by the Batetela, a tribe situated between the Lomami River and the Sankuru River in the Kasai Province of central Belgian Congo. The ngomo skin drum is used for dancing, usually accompanying the lukumbi, the six-toned slit drum. The ekuli, a small cylindrical two-toned drum, formerly used to signal victory in battle, is now used to call people to church and classes. The lukumbi is the most interesting and intricate of the three, and constitutes a highly developed poetic and musical art form as well as a means of communication".
