= Kalemie =

Kalemie Ville de Kalemie (French) Mji wa Kalemie (Swahili)
- Provincial capital and city
- Ville de Kalemie
- Motto(s): Build our Nation, Spirit of Patriotism
- Location in Democratic Republic of the Congo
- Coordinates: 05°54′46″S 29°11′26″E
- Country: DR Congo
- Province: Tanganyika
- Founded: 1891
- Founded by: Alphonse Jacques
- Communes: Kalemie, Lac, Lukuga

Government
  - Mayor: David Mukeba

Population (2012)
  - Total: 146,974
- Time zone: UTC+2 (CAT)
- National language: Swahili
- Climate: Aw

Kalemie, formerly Albertville or Albertstad, is a city on the western shore of Lake Tanganyika in the Democratic Republic of the Congo. The Lukuga River, that drains Lake Tanganyika to the Lualaba River, runs through the city. Kalemie is the capital of Tanganyika Province.

== History ==
From 1886 to 1891, the Society of Missionaries of Africa had founded catholic missions at the north and south ends of Lake Tanganyika. Léopold Louis Joubert, a French soldier and armed auxiliary, was dispatched by Archbishop Charles Lavigerie's Society of Missionaries of Africa to protect the missionaries. The missionaries abandoned three of the new stations due to attacks by Tippu Tip and Rumaliza. By 1891 the Arab slave traders had control of the entire western shore of the lake, apart from the region defended by Joubert around Mpala and St Louis de Mrumbi. The anti-slavery expedition under Captain Alphonse Jacques—financed by the Belgian Anti-Slavery Society—came to the relief of Joubert on 30 October 1891. When the Jacques expedition arrived Joubert's garrison was down to about two hundred men, poorly armed with "a most miscellaneous assortment of chassepots, Remingtons and muzzle-loaders, without suitable cartridges." He also had hardly any medicine left. Captain Jacques asked Joubert to remain on the defensive while his expedition moved north.

=== Founding of Albertville ===
On 30 December 1891 Captain Alphonse Jacques' anti-slavery expedition founded the military post of Albertville on the shores of Lake Tanganyika and tried to put an end to the Arab slave trade in the region. Albertville was located 15 km (9.3 mi) south of the Lukuga River. Sergeant Alexis Vrithoff was killed on 5 April 1892 when defending Albertville against an attack by Arab slavers under Rumaliza. His troops, based at Kataki, surrounded Albertville on that day and besieged the outpost for several months, from 16 August 1892 until 1 January 1893. Eventually, Rumaliza's forces had to retreat because of the arrival of the Long-Duvivier-Demol Anti-Slavery expedition, a relief column sent from Brussels at captain Alphonse Jacques's aide.

After the Arabs left the territory, the original Albertville was gradually abandoned, and the name became attached to the military post of M'Toa to the north of the Lukuga, the site of present-day Kalemie.

=== World War I and the East African campaign ===
In 1914 Albertville was the base for the Belgo-Congolese forces in the East African campaign. The railway reached Albertville in 1915, and in 1916 the port was constructed and the coalworks at Greinerville opened. At the end of 1940 a military base was established at Albertville, initially South African and later British, to manage troops in Kenya and Abyssinia.

=== Post-independence and name change to Kalemie ===
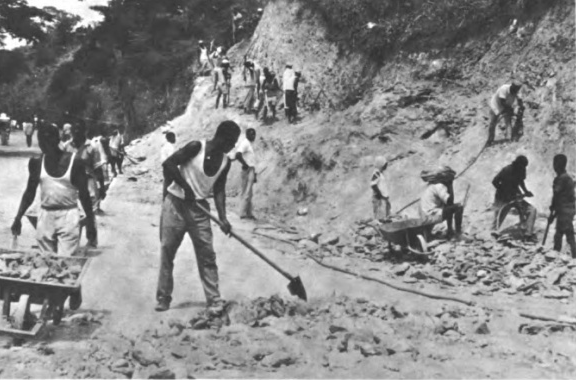
Economic rehabilitation project in Albertville following Simba rebellion, 1965

Albertville was attacked by mercenaries under Major Mike Hoare during operations against the Simba Rebellion in August 1964.

In the late 1960s and early 1970s under the regime of Mobutu Sese Seko the Zairianization policy was implemented, this included numerous changes to the state and to private life, including the renaming of the Congo and its cities, as well as an eventual mandate that Zairians were to abandon their Christian names for more "authentic" ones. In addition, Western-style attire was banned and replaced with the Mao-style tunic labeled the "abacost" and its female equivalent. The policy began to wane in the late 1970s and had mostly been abandoned by 1990.

In 1971, as a result of the Zairianization, Albertville changed its name to Kalemie. The Town of Kalemie also hosts the major University of Kalemie, which maintains the largest library in the region.

== Climate ==
Kalemie has a tropical savanna climate (Köppen: Aw).

Climate data for Kalemie
Month	Jan	Feb	Mar	Apr	May	Jun	Jul	Aug	Sep	Oct	Nov	Dec	Year
Daily mean °C (°F)	24.0 (75.2)	24.3 (75.7)	24.3 (75.7)	24.2 (75.6)	23.6 (74.5)	21.8 (71.2)	21.2 (70.2)	22.7 (72.9)	24.1 (75.4)	25.1 (77.2)	24.2 (75.6)	23.7 (74.7)	23.6 (74.5)
Average precipitation mm (inches)	122 (4.8)	96 (3.8)	139 (5.5)	206 (8.1)	82 (3.2)	7 (0.3)	1 (0.0)	7 (0.3)	31 (1.2)	58 (2.3)	163 (6.4)	174 (6.9)	1,086 (42.8)
Source: Climate-Data.org

== Economy ==
Kalemie serves as an important town in the Katanga province, Manufactures include cement, food products, and textiles.

=== Mining ===
The town consequently serves as a distribution centre for such minerals as copper, cobalt, zinc, gold, tin, and coal.

=== Transport ===
==== Airport ====
The town is served by Kalemie Airport, with flights to other airports in the country.

==== Rail ====
Kalemie is a station on the country's main railway network Société Nationale des Chemins de Fer du Congo (SNCC), and is connected to Nyunzu, Kindu, Kongolo, Kabalo, Kamina and Lubumbashi. The estimated travel time between Kalemie and Lubumbashi by rail is four to seven days, though there are often delays. The railway plays an important role for transportation of goods to Haut Katanga and specifically Lubumbashi, with its mining industry.

The railway line between Kalemie and Kindu was destroyed by heavy rains in February 2024, but in December same year, the railway was re-opened to traffic again (after 11 months interruption).

==== Water ====
Kalemie lies at the centre of water lines to Kigoma, Tanzania, Mpulungu, Zambia, Uvira, DRC and Bujumbura, Burundi.

=== Energy/power ===
There is only one official transmission line to feed the electrical grid of Kalemie, coming from Bendera Hydroelectric Plant aka Kiymbi Dam. The power station needs rehabilitation for improving the capacity and reliability, in order to support the financial growth, as well as environmental and social development of Kalemie and the region.

== Language(s) ==
Although French is the official language, the main language in Kalemie is a dialect of Kiswahili found in Tanzania. This dialect, known as Kingwana, is spoken along the east side of Congo (including the provinces of North Kivu, South Kivu, Maniema, Katanga and Oriental, Western Kasai and Eastern Kasai) and almost all the way across to the Katangan border with Angola.

== Sports ==
Kalemie is home to football clubs Tanganyika, FC Etoile Jaune (Yellow Stars) and many more.

== Kalemie Port ==
The port at Kalemie was built to connect the Great Lakes rail line (from the Kabalo junction on the Lualaba River) to the Tanzanian lake port and railhead at Kigoma, from where the Tanzanian Central Railway Line runs to the seaport of Dar es Salaam. The port was built with a 130 m (430 ft) wharf and 3 mobile cranes, giving it a capacity of 500 t (550 short tons) per day with two shifts. Currently, the cranes are not functional, and vessels cannot reach the wharf due to silting up of the lake next to it. The buildings of the port also require rehabilitation. Moreover, the railway line for 100 km (62 mi) west of Kalemie is 'very degraded' and not fully operational.

Kalemie Port is also used by boat services to the northern Lake Tanganyika ports of Kalundu-Uvira and Bujumbura in Burundi, and southwards to Moba and Mpulungu in Zambia.

Kalemie Port is operated by the railway company SNCC which also operates the railways in DR Congo (except for the Matadi-Kinshasa line) as well as boat services on the eastern waterways in the country.

== Town partnerships ==
Kalemie maintains partnership links with the following places:

- Steinheim, Germany

== 2005 earthquake ==
The Lake Tanganyika earthquake struck on December 5, 2005. The epicentre was approximately 10 km (6.2 mi) below the surface of Lake Tanganyika, some 55 km (34 mi) south-east of Kalemie. At least dozens of houses were destroyed.
