= Tippu Tip =

Afro-Omani ivory and slave trader (c. 1837–1905)

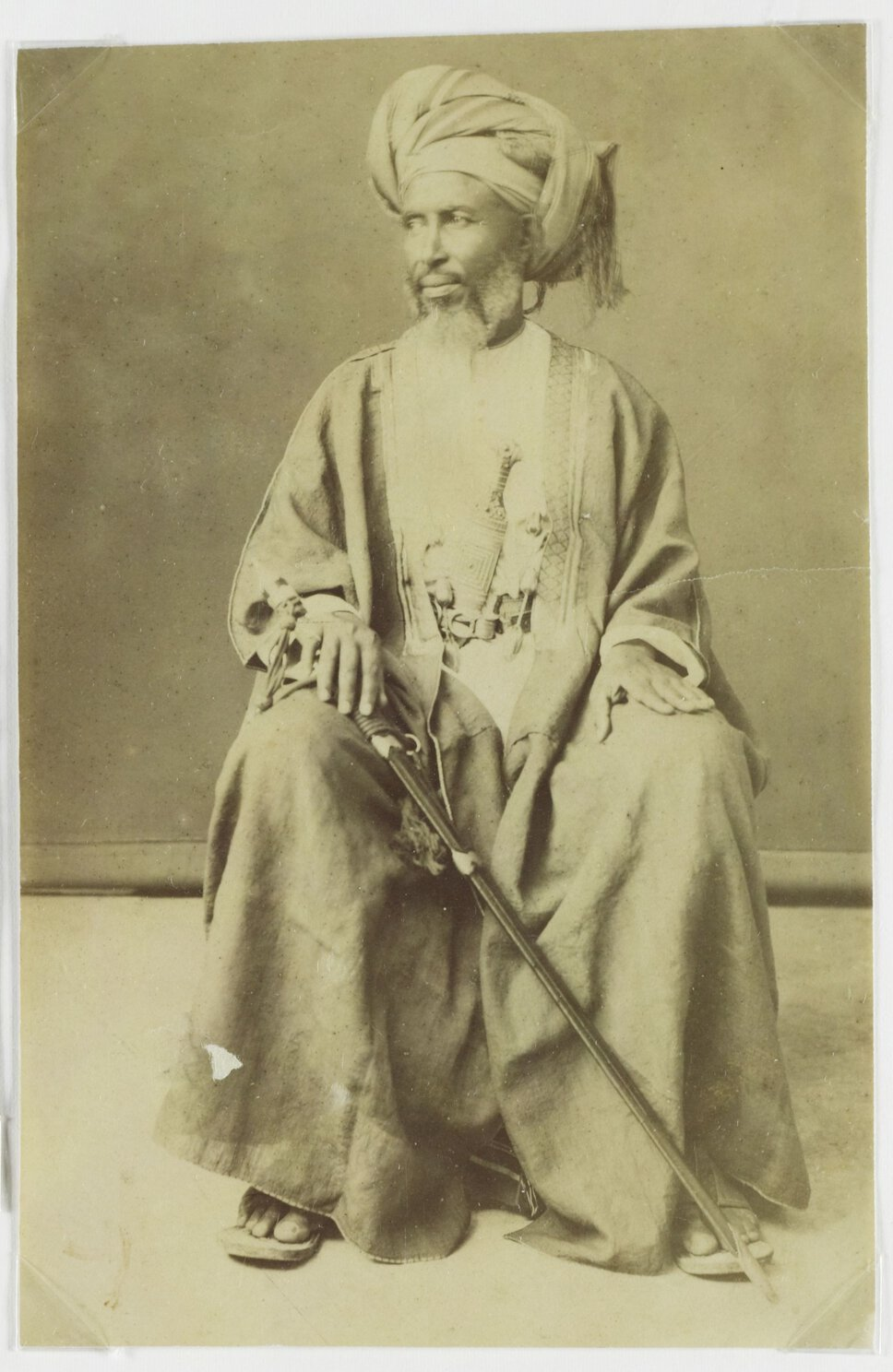
- The famous Slave trader, Hamad Bin Muhammad Bin Rajab Al-Murjabi, more commonly known by his nickname, Tippu Tip / Tippu Tib
- Born: Hamad bin Muhammad bin Juma bin Rajab el Murjebi c. 1832; Zanzibar, Omani Empire
- Died: June 14, 1905 (aged 68); Stone Town, Sultanate of Zanzibar
- Other name: Tippu Tib
- Occupations: Slave trader, ivory merchant, explorer, governor
- Children: Sefu bin Hamid

Signature
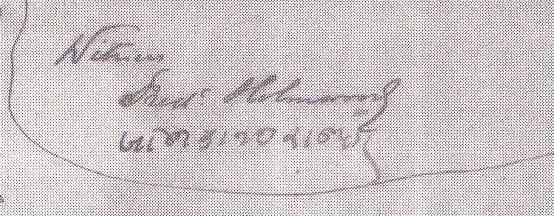

Tippu Tip, also spelled Tippu Tib or Tippoo Tib (c. 1832 – June 14, 1905), real name Ḥamad ibn Muḥammad ibn Jumʿah ibn Rajab ibn Muḥammad ibn Saʿīd al Murjabī (Arabic: حمد بن محمد بن جمعة بن رجب بن محمد بن سعيد المرجبي), was an Arab-Omani ivory and slave trader, plantation owner, explorer, and governor. He worked for a succession of sultans of Zanzibar, trading in slaves for Zanzibar's clove plantations.

As part of the large and lucrative trade, he led many trading expeditions into Central Africa, constructing profitable trading posts deep inside the Congo Basin region, thus becoming the best-known slave and ivory trader in Africa, supplying much of the world with ivory from enslaved Africans. While still loyal to the Sultan of Zanzibar, he came to rule a large territory in the eastern Congo, centered on the town of Kasongo in the present-day Democratic Republic of the Congo, in his own right.

== Early life ==
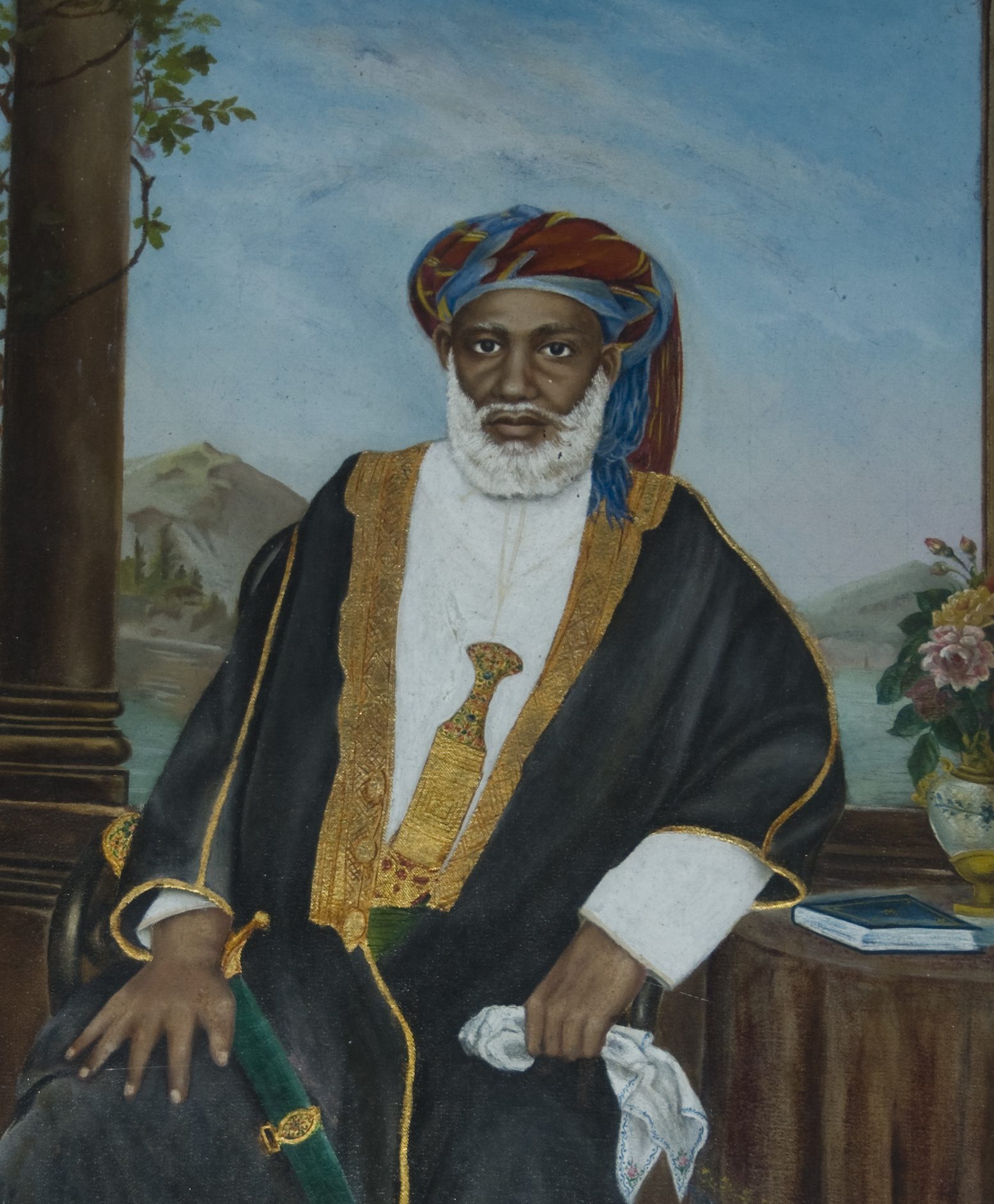
Portrait of Tippu Tip, House of Wonders Museum, Stone Town, Zanzibar.

Tippu Tip was probably born in Zanzibar in the 1830s, although sources differ on the exact year. According to Heinrich Brode, who based his account largely on Tippu Tip's own recollections, Tippu Tip's mother, Bint Habib bin Bushir, was the daughter of a "respected and prosperous Muscat family" of the Wardi clan. His paternal ancestors were Arab traders connected with the Swahili Coast and the interior caravan trade. His paternal great-grandmother, Mwana Arabu, was the daughter of Juma bin Muhammed el Nebhani, a member of a respected Muscat family, and an African woman from Mbwa Maji, south of Dar es Salaam.

Throughout his life, Hamad bin Muhammad bin Juma bin Rajab el Murjebi was more commonly known as Tippu Tip. Hinde translated the nickname as "the gatherer together of wealth". According to Tippu Tip's own account, however, the name came from the "tiptip" sound of gunfire during expeditions in Central Africa.

At a relatively young age, Tippu Tip led a group of about 100 men from Zanzibar into Central Africa, seeking slaves and ivory. After raiding several areas, he returned to Zanzibar to consolidate his resources and recruit more followers. He later returned to the African mainland.

== Career ==
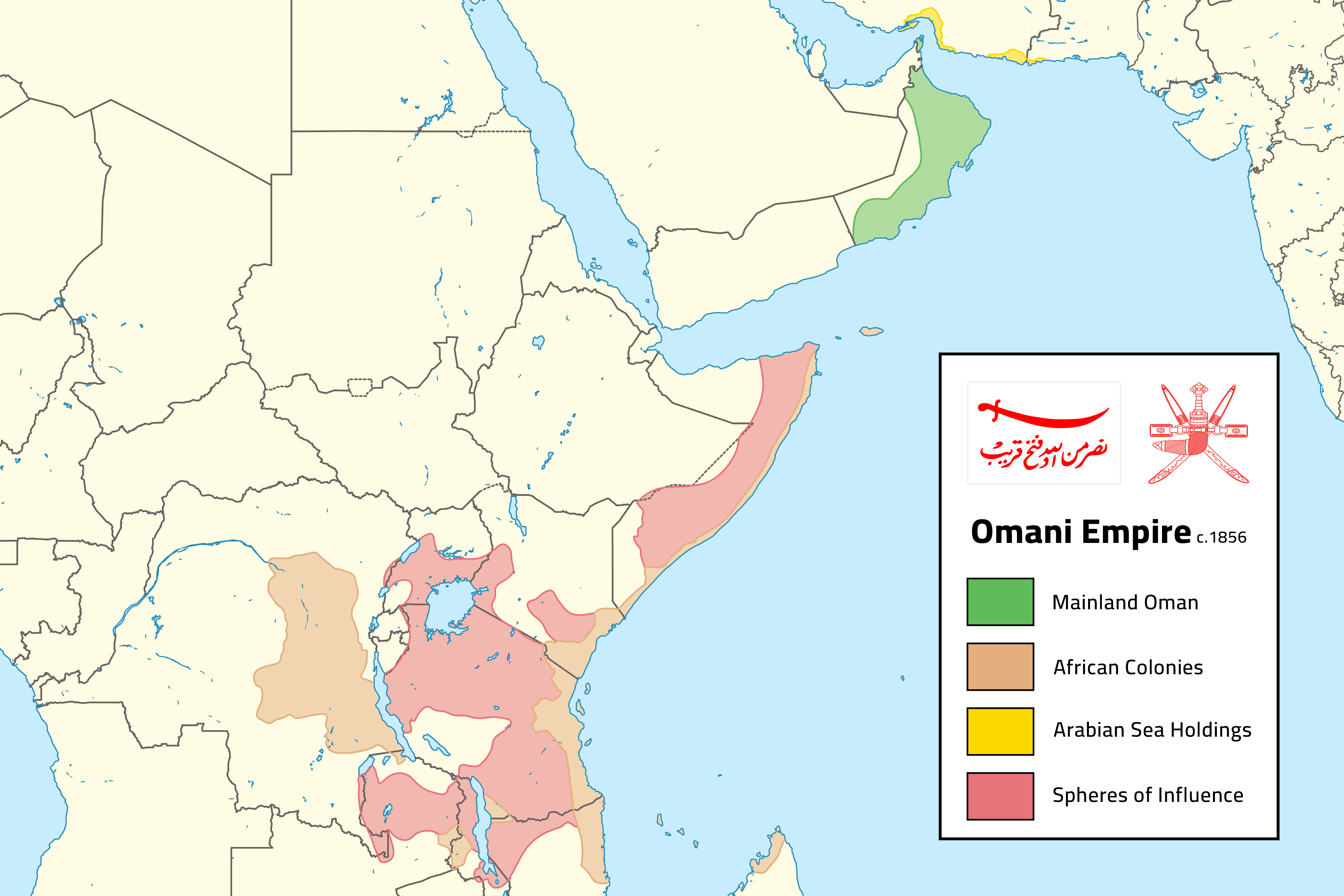
Tippu Tip's state was located in modern-day Congo.

Tippu Tip built a slave-trading empire, and is considered the second wealthiest Muslim slave trader in history, using the proceeds to establish clove plantations on Zanzibar. Abdul Sheriff reported that, when he left for his twelve years of "empire building" on the mainland, he had no plantations of his own. By 1895, he had acquired "seven 'shambas' [plantations] and 10,000 slaves".

He met and helped several Western explorers of the African continent, including David Livingstone and Henry Morton Stanley. Between 1884 and 1887, he claimed the Eastern Congo for himself and for the Sultan of Zanzibar, Bargash bin Said el Busaidi. In spite of his position as protector of Zanzibar's interests in Congo, he managed to maintain good relations with the Europeans. When, in August 1886, fighting broke out between the Swahili and the representatives of King Leopold II of Belgium at Stanley Falls, al-Murjabī went to the Belgian consul at Zanzibar to assure him of his "good intentions". Although he was still a force in Central African politics, he could see by 1886 that power in the region was shifting.

=== Military victories during his career in Central and Eastern Africa ===
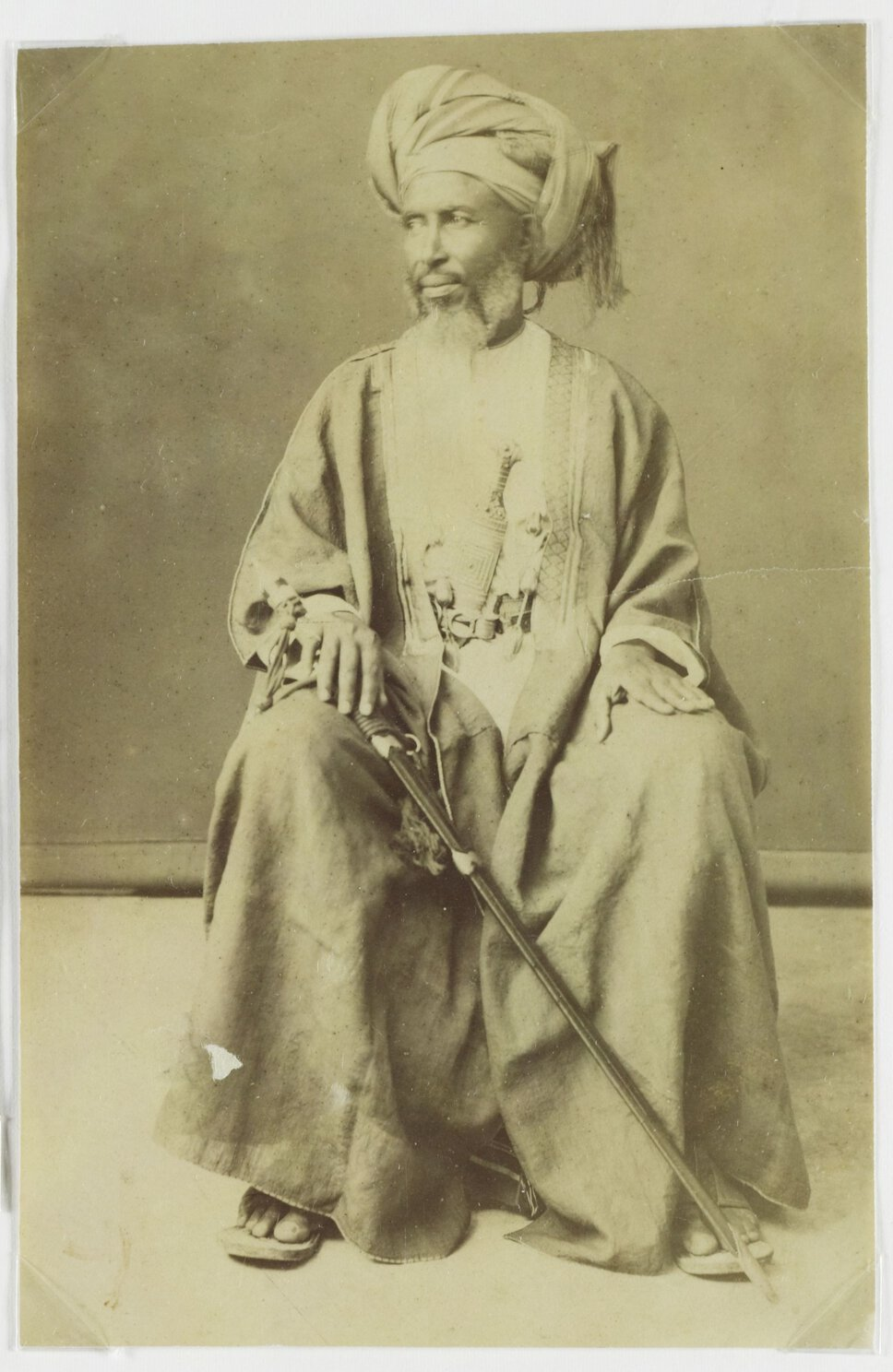
Tippu Tip in the late 1880s/1890s, taken in Zanzibar

Tippu Tip's military forces were extremely successful in Central and Eastern Africa, upsetting the balance of power in the region and accumulating vast, decisive victories that enriched Tippu Tip with war spoils, like slaves, precious metals, and ivory.

==== 1859–1860 campaign in Unyanyembe ====
Tippu Tip first arrived in the region that is now central Tanzania, specifically the Tabora Region, with a force of less than a hundred men, armed only with muskets and had managed to, in a few short years, kill in battle a few thousand enemies and take thousands of slaves and pounds of ivory. This early engagement was where Hamad bin Muhammad first showed his military prowess. A part of a band of roughly 300 men, armed with muskets, they had managed to defeat a force of a few thousand Nyamwezi warriors, who were defending their chieftain, Mnywa Sere. The coastal slave traders wanted to overthrow Mnywa Sere, and assaulted his fortified village, which was surrounded by large earthen defences. Tippu Tip himself and a force of about a hundred men entered his fortified village and managed to capture the Chieftain, but Tippu Tip was wounded by an arrow in this fight. The coastal slave traders had killed nearly the entire enemy force and captured Mnywa Sere, who they imprisoned and replaced with Mkasiva.

==== Punitive expedition to Usaramo in 1864 ====
Returning from Unyanyembe with his share of the captured goods, Tippu Tip and his caravan was attacked by a large force of Zaramo people armed with Muskets. Tippu Tip returned with a force of 80 men, and he led a 5-day campaign through their territory. He captured 800 enemies and took them as slaves, as well as a large amount of copper.

==== Conquest of Itahua and the defeat of King Nsama in 1867 ====
Tippu Tip had first set out to Itahua on the 12th of May, 1867, according to Livingstone, after hearing reports of its vast riches in ivory, gold, copper and slaves. The country of Itahua was ruled by a powerful and bloodthirsty chief, known as King Nsama. Tippu Tip had become aware that Nsama could raise a force of 20,000 men through reports from Amer bin Said esh Shaqsi, an Arab trader already based in Itahua. Amer bin Said had lead an expedition some years earlier, but he was one of few survivors. Tippu Tip and his men crossed the stream which formed boundary between Urungu and Itahua, in the modern day district of Haut-Ulele. The area, next to the famous Ituri forest known for its difficult terrain, is similarly difficult to traverse, especially in the Victorian period. The area was full of dense jungle, and highly populated due to previous raids that had forced the population into the area. After six days of marching through the difficult terrain, Tippu Tip and his force had reached the base of a mountain, where Nsama had made his capital. It was heavily fortified with palisades, thorn bushes and trenches, and had a large population of some 50,000. Tippu Tips' force consisted of a few hundred men including porters, with only 105 men who were all armed with muskets. Nsama had summoned all of the Coastal traders in the vicinity of the city to his court, and outraged during an argument, he ordered them to leave. The next day, Nsama had ordered them to return to the city, where they were ambushed by a force of a few thousand of his warriors, at least 3,000. Tippu Tips' forces were caught off-guard and two of their porters were killed, and one of their soldiers was wounded. Tippu Tip himself was wounded by an arrow, but despite this he rallied his forces into formation where they fought off the attackers, who were poorly trained and attacked from all sides. The enemy spread its muskets out thinly and did not form any formation. They attacked Tippu Tip believing their numerical advantage would overpower him. After the first volley, Tippu Tips' forces had cut down 200 attackers. After the first hour, Tippu Tips' forces had killed 1,000 enemies, and the Chieftain Nsama had fled the city with most of the civilians. That night Nsama and his forces returned to the city, which Tippu Tip and his forces had made camp in, and Nsama besieged them. By the following morning, the enemy had gathered in great masses, probably around 20,000 men. Even the Chiefs' sons who lived far away had arrived with their soldiers at the town. The enemy began to smoke hemp and beat the drums, the smoke obscured the outer edge of the city. Tippu Tip gathered 50 of his best men and 50 of his best guns, most likely breech loading rifles, and he sent 10 men to each gate. They fired from the gates, and then returned to the center where another group of ten would advance and fire. The next morning, Tippu Tips' forces exited the city to loot the defeated enemy force, who had suffered another 600 casualties, whereas Tippu Tips' force did not lose a single man. Later on in the day, another crowd of enemy soldiers attacked the city. Tippu Tip let the enemy force get within close proximity to the town, then giving the order for his troops to charge with their swords. The already frightened enemy force broke ranks and fled, and suffered another 150 casualties, with Tippu Tips' force losing two men. On the third day, an even larger force arrived at the town, and once again the enemy force got extremely close to the town, before Tippu Tip and his forces fired a volley from their guns, and then charging the fleeing enemy forces. They killed another 250 enemies, losing 3 men themselves and another 4 were wounded. After Nsamas' men had stopped attacking the city, Tippu Tip and his force as well as his porters left the city, pursuing their fleeing enemies. They had chased the enemy beyond the mountain, where they caught up with them and engaged the enemy force. Their enemies quickly surrendered, and Tippu Tip captured 1,000 of them and took them as slaves, as well as countless other valuables. When retreating back to the town, Tippu Tips' force had discovered the bodies of a group of coastal merchants, in his own words describing how they were likely slaughtered by Nsama, who had resolved to seek vengeance on all of the Muslim traders in his territory. Tippu Tip looted the ivory stores in the city, and captured 1,950 Frasilas of ivory, worth £13,650 at that time or roughly $2.86 million US dollars in 2026.

All in all, Tippu Tips' forces had killed about 2,000 enemies, and taken at least another 1,000 as slaves. Countless enemies had also been wounded and the capital of that district had been completely abandoned. Tippu Tip's forces had only lost six men. In the aftermath, a rival tribe with the aid of a force of coastal traders launched a war of extermination against Itahua, which lasted two months and resulted in the overthrow of Nsama and the collapse of his state.

Afterwards Tippu Tip would return to Urungu where he would meet the famous explorer David Livingstone for the first time.

==== Tippu Tips' journey through Ugalla towards the Lunda Kingdom ====
In 1868, Tippu Tip was traveling through Ugalla in the Southern Congo, with the aim to subjugate or extract tribute from the South. He set off with a force of a few hundred soldiers, accompanied by a large number of porters. Tippu Tip arrived at the fortified town that acted as the capital for the Chief of Ugalla, and he was allowed to set up camp by the Chief. The town had large sections of ramparts and trenches surrounding it, as well as a fortification, a boma reinforced with palisades. Tippu Tip pitched camp about a kilometer from the town, and he attempted to buy provisions for his party, but he was denied by the Chief until he paid a price of five oxen and a hundred garments. After being allowed to buy his provisions, being corn, he distributed them among his followers who began to pound the corn. Tippu Tip would be summoned to meet the chief, and as a precaution would take with him 16 men, who had with them loaded guns. On the way to the town, he encountered a Swahili from his party who told him furiously "that a savage had spilled all his corn and belaboured him with his fists ; he was going now to fetch his gun and meant to avenge himself on the ruffian." Tippu Tip attempted to convince him to refrain from shooting the native, and he was successful in doing so, with the young man returning to camp, and Tippu Tip then continued towards the Chiefs' hut. Tippu Tip greeted the Chief, who welcomed him warmly and introduced him to his first wife. As Tippu Tip was leaving the hut, a young soldier of his drew his pistol on one of the native soldiers. Tippu Tip tried to convince the soldier to withdraw, grabbing his ear multiple times, but it was too late and the tribal soldiers had become aware of the situation and began to converge on them. The natives began to scream and shout, and began attacking Tippu Tip and his men with spears, and in the chaos two of Tippu Tips' slaves were killed. Tippu Tip returned to the Chief and called on him to control his subjects, but whether he felt powerless or in support of his subjects, he attempted to flee the hut, but he did not get far as he was immediately shot by one of Tippu Tips' men. "At sight of their falling chieftain the savages took to flight.". Tippu Tip and his party attempted to exit out of the nearest gate and escape the town, and as they began to flee found the entire town deserted, as the inhabitants had scattered and fled. From the distance, they spotted another caravan, who were flying the red flag of the Sultan.

The Flag of the Sultanate of Zanzibar from 1856 - 1963

Tippu Tip and his caravan returned to the town and plundered it for the remaining valuables and civilians who had remained, who were taken as slaves. Tippu Tip remained in the town for a few days, but no attacked was launched against him. Tippu Tip was convinced by his associate Said Bin Ali, not to leave the town and to instead defend it, which he decided to go through with. They did not have to wait long for the enemy attack, as on the eighth day, they launched their attack on the town. Shortly after their first prayer, they heard the marching of the approaching enemy force. Tippu Tip organized his soldiers into formation and they repelled the attack with ease, killing 70 attackers and suffering no casualties themselves. Tippu Tip remained in the town until a party led by a Liwali (Wali, or Governor in English.) arrived, on his way from Tabora to Buganda. Tippu Tip left after receiving news from the Liwali, and made his way to Lake Tanganyika, reaching it after a few days of travel, where he and the rest of his party were infected with dysentery and had to make camp for a few days.

=== Governor of the Stanley Falls District ===
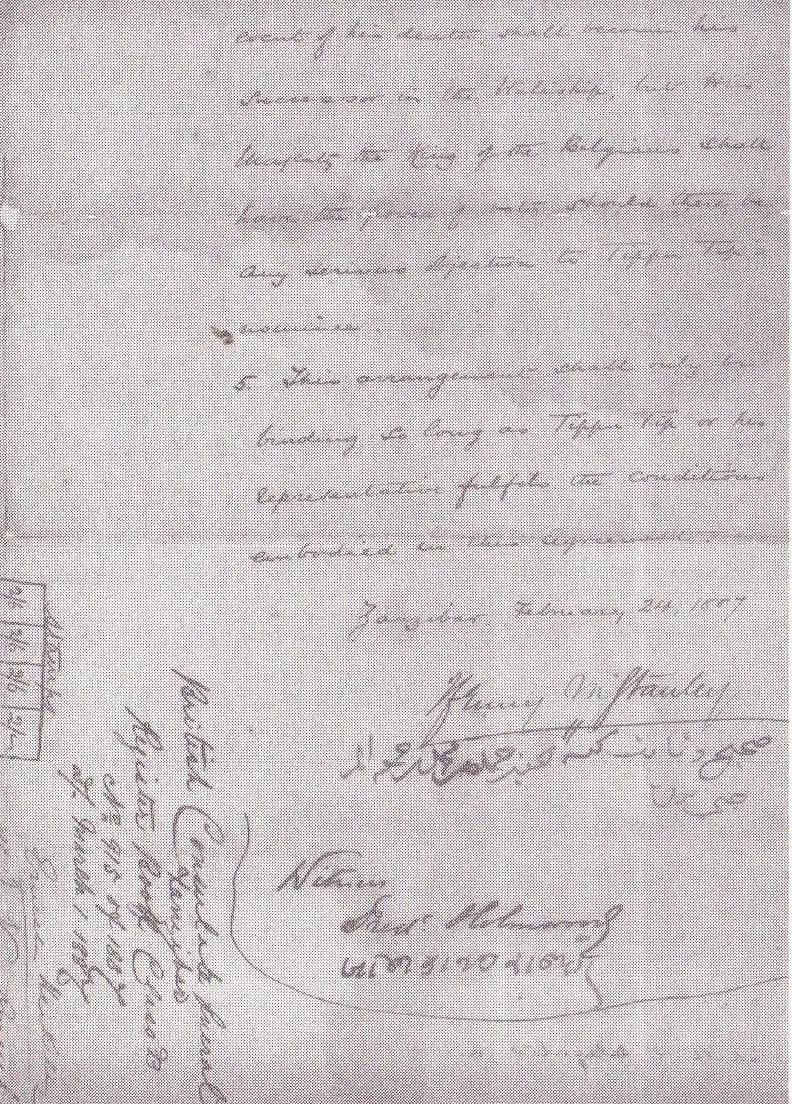
The contract signed between Henry Morton Stanley and Tippu Tip on behalf of King Leopold II at the British consulate in Zanzibar in 1887, in which Leopold appoints Tippu Tip as governor of the Stanley Falls District

In early 1887, Stanley arrived in Zanzibar and proposed that Tippu Tip be made governor of the Stanley Falls District in the Congo Free State. Both Leopold and Sultan Barghash bin Said of Zanzibar agreed and on February 24, 1887, Tippu Tip accepted. At the same time, he agreed to man the expedition which Stanley had been commissioned to organize for the purpose of rescuing Emin Pasha (E. Schnitzer), the German governor of Equatoria (a region of Ottoman Egypt, today in South Sudan) who had been stranded in the Bahr el Ghazal area as a result of the Mahdi uprising in Sudan.

Tippu Tip travelled back to the Upper Congo in the company of Stanley, but this time by way of the Atlantic coast and up the Congo River. Aside from its doubtful usefulness, the relief expedition was marred by the near annihilation of its rearguard.

=== Congo Arab War ===
After his tenure as governor, the Congo Arab war broke out. Both sides fought with armies consisting mostly of local African soldiers fighting under the command of either Arab or European leaders.

When Tippu Tip left the Congo, the authority of King Leopold's Free State was still very weak in the Eastern parts of the territory and the power lay largely with local Arabic or Swahili strongmen. Amongst these were Tippu Tip's son Sefu bin Hamid and a trader known as Rumaliza in the area close to Lake Tanganyika.

In 1892, Sefu bin Hamid attacked Belgian ivory traders, who were seen as a threat to the Arab-Swahili trade. The Free State government sent a force under commander Francis Dhanis to the East. Dhanis had an early success when chief Ngongo Lutete changed sides from Sefu's to his. The better armed and organised Belgian force defeated their opponents in several fights until the death of Sefu on October 20, 1893, and finally forcing also Rumaliza to flee to German territory in 1895.

=== Death ===
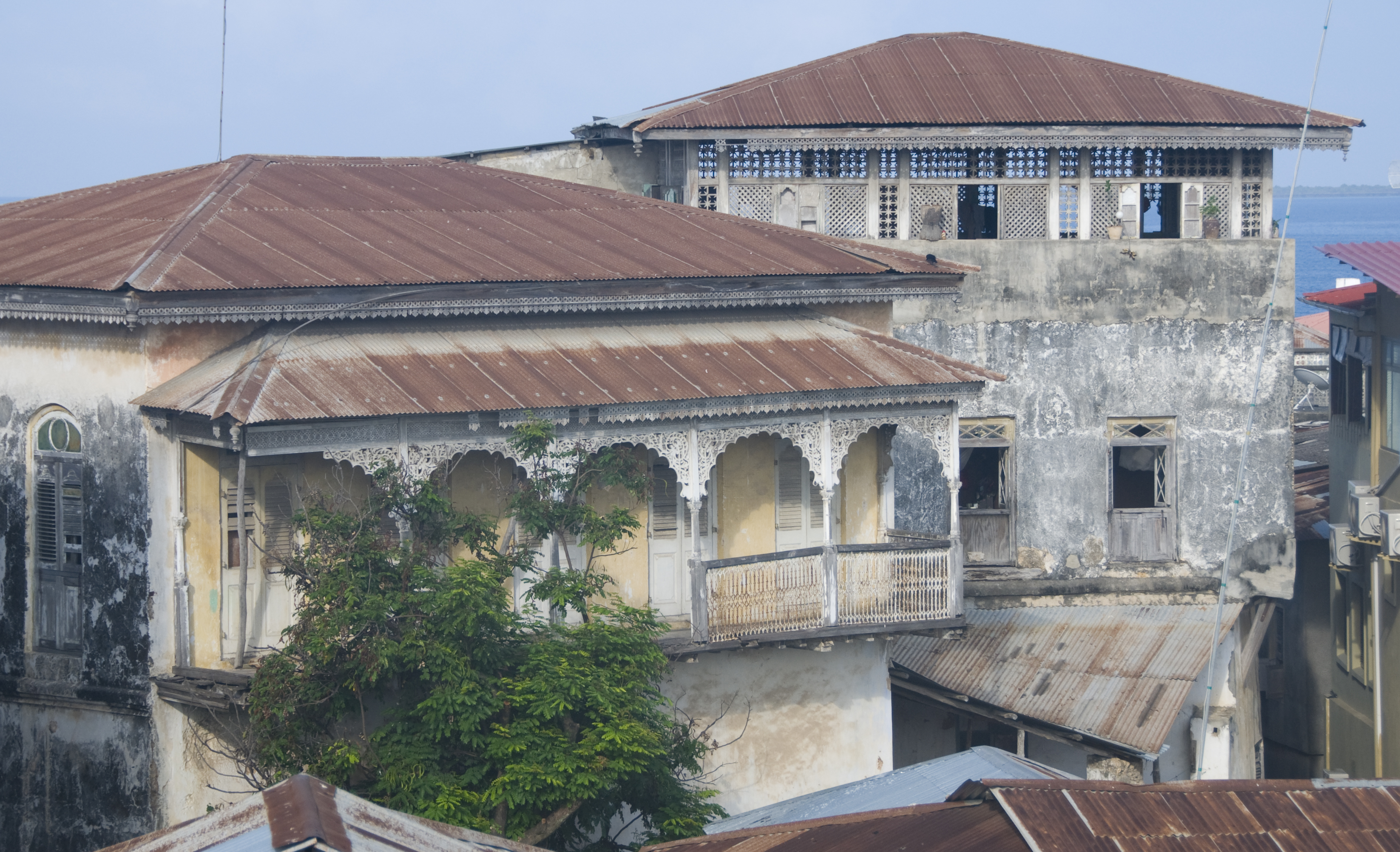
House of Tippu Tip in Stone Town, Zanzibar City

In 1891, Tippu Tip retired and returned to Zanzibar, where he became a close advisor to Sultan Hamoud bin Mohammed but made no more journeys into the African interior. He set out to write an account of his life, which is the first example of the literary genre of autobiography in the Bantu Swahili language. Heinrich Brode, who knew him in Zanzibar, transcribed the manuscript into Roman script and translated it into German. It was subsequently translated into English and published in Britain in 1907.

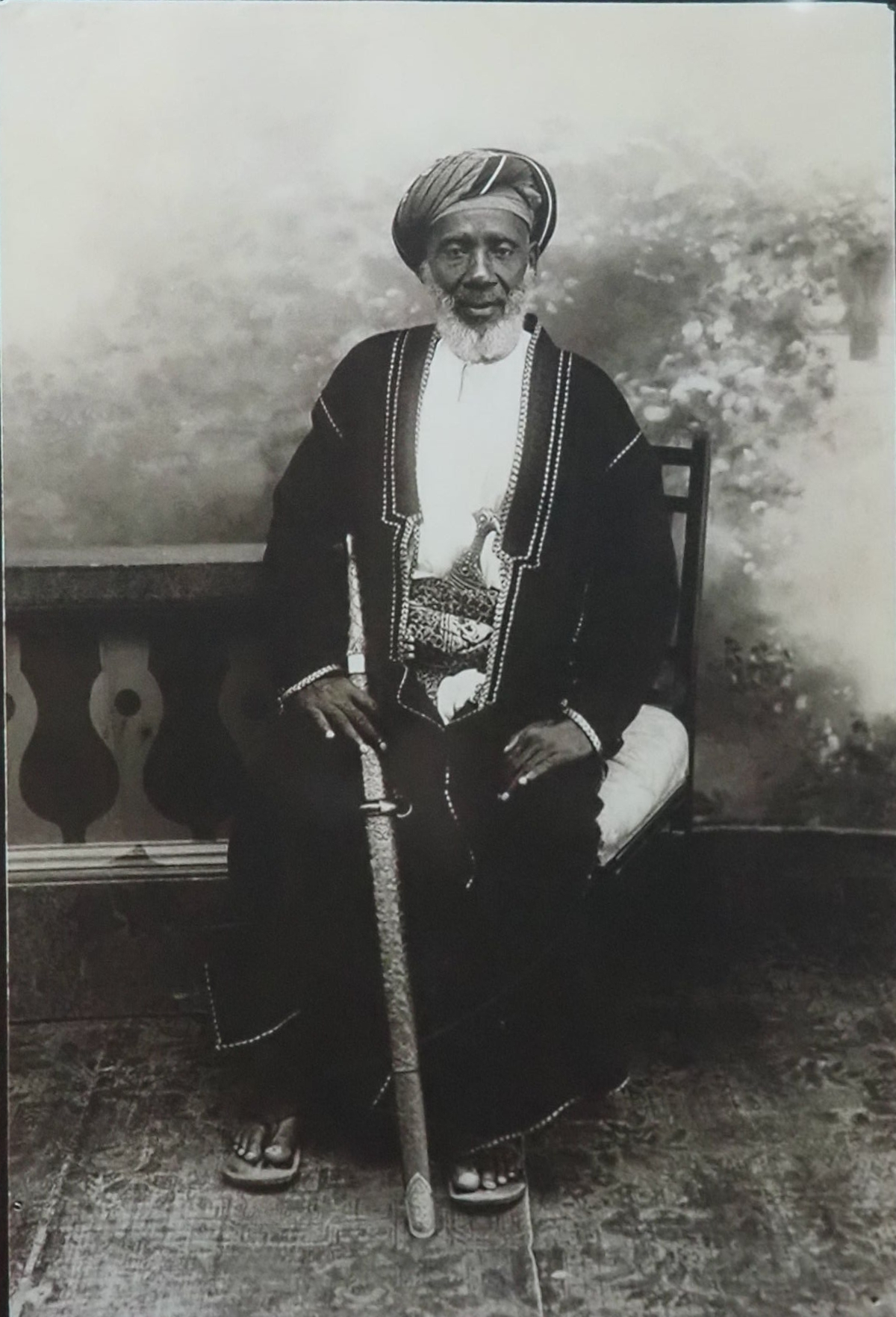
Tippu Tip

On 13 June 1905, Tippu Tip died of malaria (according to Brode) in his home in Stone Town, the main town on the island of Zanzibar.

== See also ==
- Zanzibar slave trade

== Sources ==
- Bennett, Norman Robert (1986). Arab vs. European: Diplomacy and war in Nineteenth-Century East Central Africa. New York: Africana Publishing Company.
- Elliot, Charles (1907). Preface. Tippoo Tib: The Story of His Career in Zanzibar & Central Africa. By Brode, Heinrich. Translated by Havelock, H. London: Arnold.
- Edgerton, Robert B. (2002). The Troubled Heart of Africa: A History of the Congo. New York: St. Martin's Press. ISBN 0-312-30486-2.
- Hinde, Sidney Langford (1897). The Fall of the Congo Arabs. London: Methuen & co. ISBN 978-1313986960.
- Maisha ya Hamed bin Mohammed el Murjebi yaani Tippu Tip kwa maneno yake mwenyewe, kimefasiriwa na W.H. Whitely (toleo la Kiswahili - Kiingereza), East Africa Literature Bureau 1974
- Oliver, Roland Anthony (2004). Africa since 1800. Cambridge University Press. p. 85. ISBN 0-521-83615-8. "tippu tip mother."
- Sheriff, Abdul (1987). Slaves, Spices and Ivory in Zanzibar: Integration of an East African Commercial Empire into the World Economy, 1770-1873. Boydell & Brewer. doi:10.2307/j.ctv134vkg1. ISBN 978-0-85255-015-1. JSTOR j.ctv134vkg1.
