= Francis Dhanis =

Belgian colonial civil servant and soldier

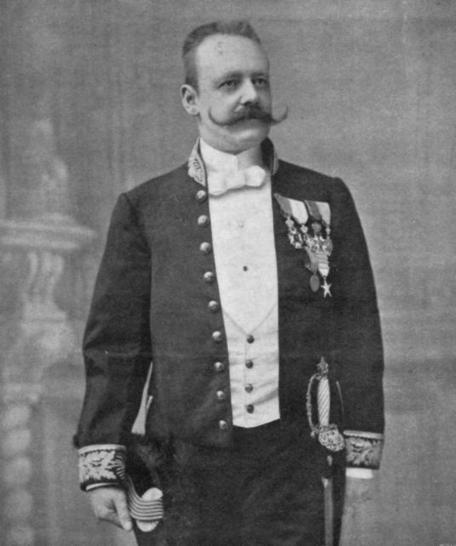

Vice Governor General of the Congo Free State
- In office 1896–1897
- Governor-General: Théophile Wahis
- Preceded by: Théophile Wahis
- Succeeded by: Émile Wangermée

Personal details
- Born: Baron Francis Ernest Joseph Marie Dhanis; 11 March 1861 London, United Kingdom
- Died: 13 November 1909 (aged 48) Brussels, Belgium

Military service
- Allegiance: Belgium
- Service years: 1884–1900
- Rank: Commandant
- Unit: Prince Boudewijn Grenadiers
- Wars: Congo Arab War; Batetela rebellion

Baron Francis Ernest Joseph Marie Dhanis (11 March 1861 – 13 November 1909) was a Belgian military officer and colonial civil servant prominent for his service for the Congo Free State during the Congo Arab War and Batetela Rebellion.

== Early life and career ==
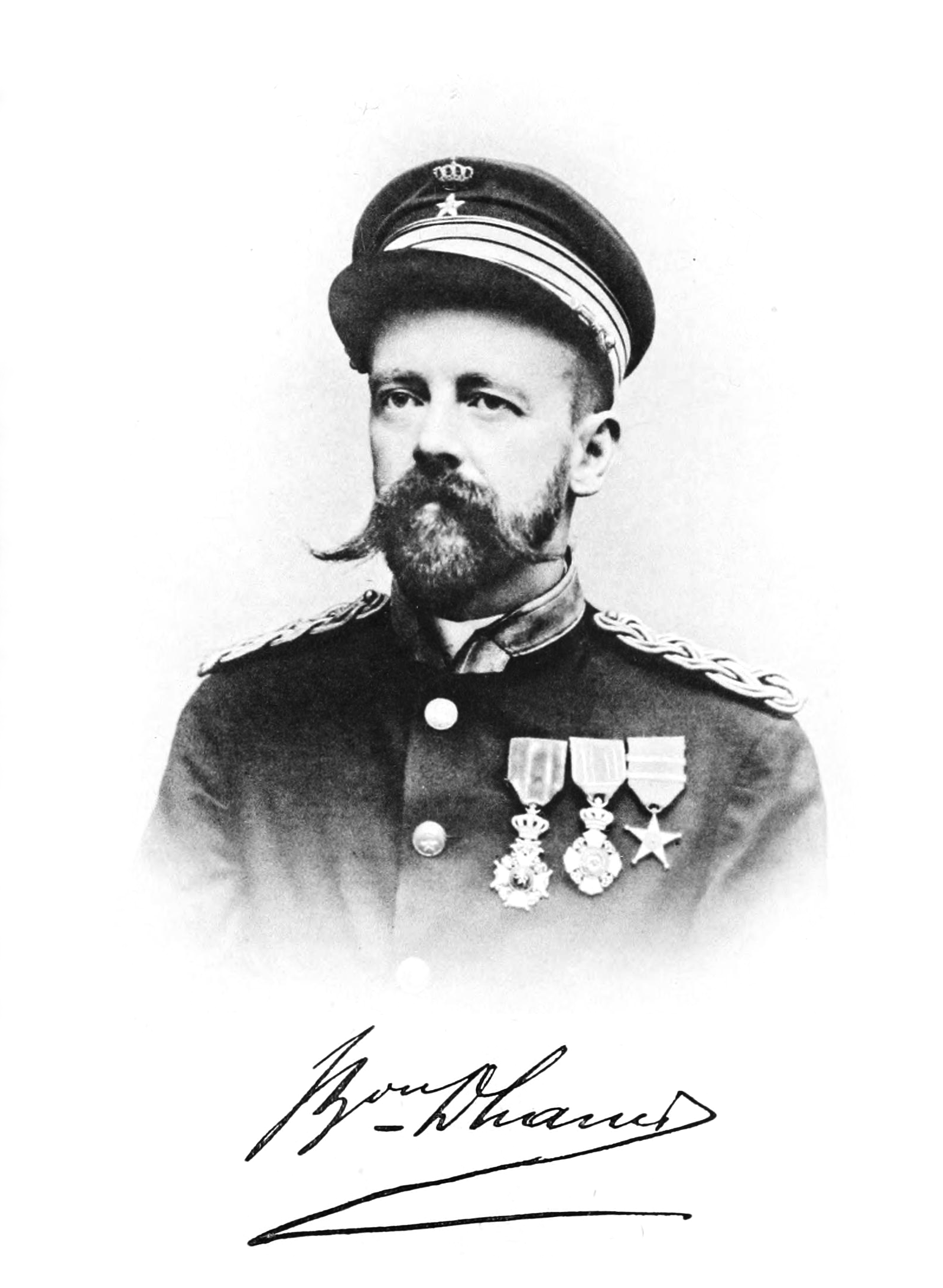

Dhanis was born in London in 1861. His father was a Belgian merchant and his mother was an Irish woman named Brigitte Maher. He spent the first fourteen years of his life at Greenock, where he received his early education. After completing his education at the Royal Military Academy in Brussels, he entered the Belgian army, joining the Regiment of Grenadiers, in which he eventually rose to the rank of Major.

== Congo Free State ==
As soon as he reached the rank of Lieutenant, he volunteered for service in the Congo Free State of King Leopold II of Belgium, and in 1887 he went out for a first term. He did so well in founding new stations north of the Congo that, when the government decided to put an end to the Arab domination on the Upper Congo, he was selected to command the chief expedition sent against the slave traders in the 'Congo Arab war'.

The Congo Arab war began in April 1892, and it was not brought to a successful conclusion until January 1894. The story of this war was narrated in detail by Sidney Langford Hinde, who took part in it, in his book The Fall of the Congo Arabs. The principal achievements of the campaign were the capture in succession of the three Arab strongholds at Nyangwe, Kasongo and Kabambari. For his services, Dhanis was awarded the noble title of baron, and in 1895 was made vice-governor of the Congo Free State.

== Later life ==
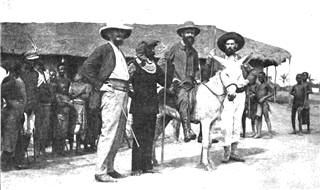
Dhanis in the Congo c. 1897; his better-armed forces were to defeat Rumaliza

In 1896, he was given command of an expedition to the Upper Nile. His troops were largely composed of the Batetela tribes who had only been recently enlisted. The Batetela under Dhanis were well-armed and experienced mercenaries. The Batetela had been irritated by the execution of some of their chiefs, allegedly for cannibalism, they mutinied and murdered many of their white officers in what has become known as the Batetela Rebellion.

From 1897 to 1898, Dhanis was constantly occupied by the rebellion. Eventually, he succeeded in breaking up the several bands of Batetela. In 1899, Baron Dhanis returned to Belgium with the honorary rank of vice governor-general. He died in Brussels on 13 November 1909.
