= Slavery in international law =

Slavery in international law is governed by a number of treaties, conventions and declarations. Foremost among these is the Universal Declaration on Human Rights (1948) that states in Article 4: “no one should be held in slavery or servitude, slavery in all of its forms should be eliminated.”

== International law protections ==
Protection from slavery is reiterated in the 1926 Slavery Convention. This is affected by the Optional Protocol to the Abolition of Slavery and the International Covenant on Civil and Political Rights (ICCPR). The ICCPR, governed by the Human Rights Committee, is responsible for internationally monitoring present conditions of slavery.

== Historical abolition of slavery ==
Abolitionism has its roots in the 1807 Abolition of Slavery Act of Great Britain. Many academics in the field perceive this as the beginning of the end of the traditional form of slavery: chattel slavery. In the 19th century, Britain controlled the majority of the world through its colonies. Consequently, in passing this law to abolish slavery, the British Parliament abolished slavery in the vast majority of its colonies.

Customarily, freedoms from slavery can also be found prior to the 19th century under the phrase "freedom from oppression and tyranny." Because slavery is a condition of complete submission of one person to another, often with the exertion of force or power of the owner over the submissive, the phrase "freedom from oppression and tyranny" accurately encompasses the right to freedom from slavery.

The United States Declaration of Independence, the French Declaration of the Rights of Man and of the Citizen, the African Charter of Human Rights, and the Constitution of South Africa all present the idea that human beings should be free from tyranny and oppression. Although slavery continued to persist in some countries after these documents were written – namely, the United States, in which slavery continued until the adoption of the Thirteenth Amendment in 1865 – the underlying norm of this right is present. Through customary practice and the abolition of slavery, the international community has adopted the right of each person to be free from slavery.

The first international attempt to address the abolition of slavery was the World Anti-Slavery Convention, organised by the British and Foreign Anti-Slavery Society at Exeter Hall in London, on 12–23 June 1840. This was however an attempt made by NGOs, not by state and governments. In the late 19th century, the issue was addressed on an international level by states and governments. The Brussels Anti-Slavery Conference 1889–90 addressed slavery on a semi-global level via the representatives of the colonial powers. It had concluded with the Brussels Conference Act of 1890. The 1890 Act was revised by the Convention of Saint-Germain-en-Laye 1919.

== Slavery Convention ==
During the 20th century the issue of slavery was addressed by the League of Nations, which founded commissions to investigate and eradicate the institution of slavery and slave trade worldwide. The Temporary Slavery Commission (TSC), which was founded in 1924, conducted a global investigation and filed a report, and a convention was drawn up to hasten the total abolition of slavery and the slave trade. The 1926 Slavery Convention, which was founded upon the investigation of the TSC of the League of Nations, was a turning point in banning global slavery.

The first large-scale move to abolish slavery by the international community came in 1926 with the Slavery Convention of the League of Nations, and again in 1957 when the Supplementary Convention was introduced by the United Nations. The 1926 Slavery Convention was the result of the Temporary Slavery Commission (TSC), the first slavery committee of the League of Nations, and provides the first international definition of slavery as:

"the status or condition of a person over whom any or all the powers attaching to the right ownership are exercised...[and] included all acts involved in the capture, acquisition, or disposal of a person with intent to reduce him to slavery; acts involved in the acquisition of a slave with a view to selling or exchanging him; all acts of disposal by sale or exchange of a slave acquired with a view to being sold or exchanged, and in general, every act of trade or transport in slaves."

Although this document provides the concrete definition of slavery, its definition is limited in the types of slavery it includes. Instead, it is descriptive of chattel slavery, such as for example the plantation slavery in the United States in the 18th and 19th centuries, a historically global form of slavery which at the time of the 1926 Slavery Convention was still legal in some parts of the world, such as in Hejaz, Yemen, Oman and the other states of the Arabian Peninsula and Persian Gulf.

In order to expand the definition of slavery, the 1956 Supplementary Convention on Slavery was signed. It gives a more comprehensive definition of slavery to include debt bondage, serfdom, or any practice where a woman is promised or given into marriage on payment of money and is without the right to refuse the marriage, the husband of a woman has the right to transfer her to another person, a woman is liable to be inherited by another upon the death of her husband, or any practice where a child under 18 years of ages is exploited for his or her labour. The 1956 Supplementary Convention on Slavery came into force on April 30, 1957 and of 2002 there were 97 states partied to the convention.

The Slavery Convention and its supplementary document are beneficial in providing an international definition of slavery; however, there is no significant enforcement behind these documents. Both are declarations made by the collaboration of the international community, and agreements that signatories would modify their national laws in accordance with the convention, with the assistance of the United Nations if necessary; however, there are no consequences outlined in either document that provide incentive for signatories to abide by the convention

== Human Rights Committee ==
The Human Rights Committee is governed by the International Covenant on Civil and Political Rights (ICCPR), which entered into force on March 23, 1976. Article 8 of this Covenant states: “No one shall be held in slavery; slavery and the slave trade in all their forms shall be prohibited. No one shall be held in servitude. No one shall be required to perform force or compulsory labour." The ICCPR outlines, in part IV, the obligations of states to uphold the freedom from slavery. All states are required to submit regular reports to the Committee on how the rights of the Covenant are being implemented. A state’s initial report must be within one year of acceding the Covenant and after this, whenever the committee requests a report (usually every four years). In addition to the submission of reports, article 41 of the Covenant makes it possible for the Committee to consider inter-state complaints, and furthermore, the First Optional Protocol to the Covenant give the Committee the capacity investigate individual complaints with regards to violations of the Covenant by state parties.

=== Observations of slavery ===
==== Mali ====
Since coming into force, the Human Rights Committee has commented on conditions of slavery in numerous countries and has provided these countries with recommendations as to how they should proceed to abolish slavery. In Mali, the committee noted that the State party has not taken clear action in response the reports of slavery like practices and hereditary servitude in the country. In acknowledging this, the committee recommended that the state should conduct research to determine if these conditions of slavery still exist, and if they do to take action. The committee also noted concerns of child trafficking into Côte d'Ivoire, where children were then being subjected to forced labour and slavery. In response to this phenomenon, the committee recommended that the Malian government take measures to prosecute the perpetrators of this traffic, and research more precise details regarding this situation for the committee analysis.

==== Serbia in part under United Nations Interim Administration Mission in Kosovo ====
The committee observed situations of trafficking of human beings, namely women and children, in Serbia Kosovo part under local municipal Kosovo Albanian administration and United Nations Interim Administration Mission in Kosovo rule, and corresponding reports that the perpetrators of these acts were going unpunished. The committee recommended that the Interim Administration Mission in Kosovo (UNMIK) in collaboration with the Provisional Institutions of Self-Government (PISG) should ensure that there is adequate investigation of these crimes and victims have access to lawyers, health care, and other forms of assistance.

==== Norway ====
The Human Rights Committee monitored trafficking in Norway. Here the committee recognizes that Norway has adopted the previous positive measures previously suggested; however, it notes that there are still reports of human trafficking, particularly women, and of female genital mutilation. The committee recommends further measures be taken to eradicate practices, as well as those to protect victims and witnesses.

== Modern slavery that falls under international law ==
=== Debt bondage ===
Debt bondage is the most common form of slavery today. It is a condition in which a person “pledges him or herself against a loan of money, but the length and nature of the service is undefined, and the labor does not diminish the original debt.” Debt bondage was included and defined as a form of slavery under the 1956 Supplementary Convention on Slavery. However, its many modern forms continue to include pawning, peonage, and worker debt. In India, debt bondage has been illegal since 1976; however, due to widespread poverty in the country, it continues to exist, as a man may need a loan to finance a wedding, funeral, medicine, fertilizer, or a fine. Because the interest rates on these debts as so high, debts are often inherited and children may replace their fathers or siblings. Debt bondage can also be incurred by specific industries – quarrying, carpet-making, agriculture, and fisheries – where the cost of equipment and supplies falls on the worker who needs a loan to pay for them.

=== Forced prostitution ===
Forced prostitution and sexual slavery are considered contemporary manifestations of this historical crime, and can be found anywhere in the world. Women are often entrapped by deceit or coercion with the promise of better life and remain entrapped by force or debt bondage. Forced marriage can also be considered a form of slavery, notably when the bride has no right or opportunity to refuse marriage. This form of marriage can also result out of a kidnapping of girls in order to sell them as brides, a widespread phenomena in China. Once married and raped, there girls are often kept under lock and key until they have a child, at which time they will be less likely to leave because they do not want to abandon their child.

=== Child slavery ===
Child slavery is also considered a contemporary form of slavery, although its does come with debate as to what constitutes child slavery. However, child prostitution is widely considered a form of slavery in which children, mostly from South East Asia, South Asia, and Latin America, “are sold by their parents either because they are destitute, have too many mouths to feed, or are simply greedy”. On the other hand, in some cases of child prostitution, when parents give their children up to traffickers, they are deceived into believing that their child will earn good money, get an education, or learn a trade.

=== Forced labour ===
Forced labour can also be imposed by governments who “conscript their own subjects and put them to work for minimal, or no pay, and for varying lengths of time”. Forced labour can, likewise, be used simply to cut production costs by private and public industries (e.g. cocoa plantations), or can be a form of involuntary servitude in the private sector – sweatshops. Bales refers to this type of slavery as contract slavery, where “contracts are offered which guarantee employment, perhaps in a workshop or factory, but when the workers are taken to their place of employment they discover that they have instead been taken into slavery...it is a way of making slavery seem legitimate and necessary”.

== See also ==
- Slave Trade Acts, with a list of international, U.K., and U.S. slavery laws
- Slavery at common law
