= Brussels Anti-Slavery Conference 1889–90 =

Conference leading to Act prohibiting slavery in Africa

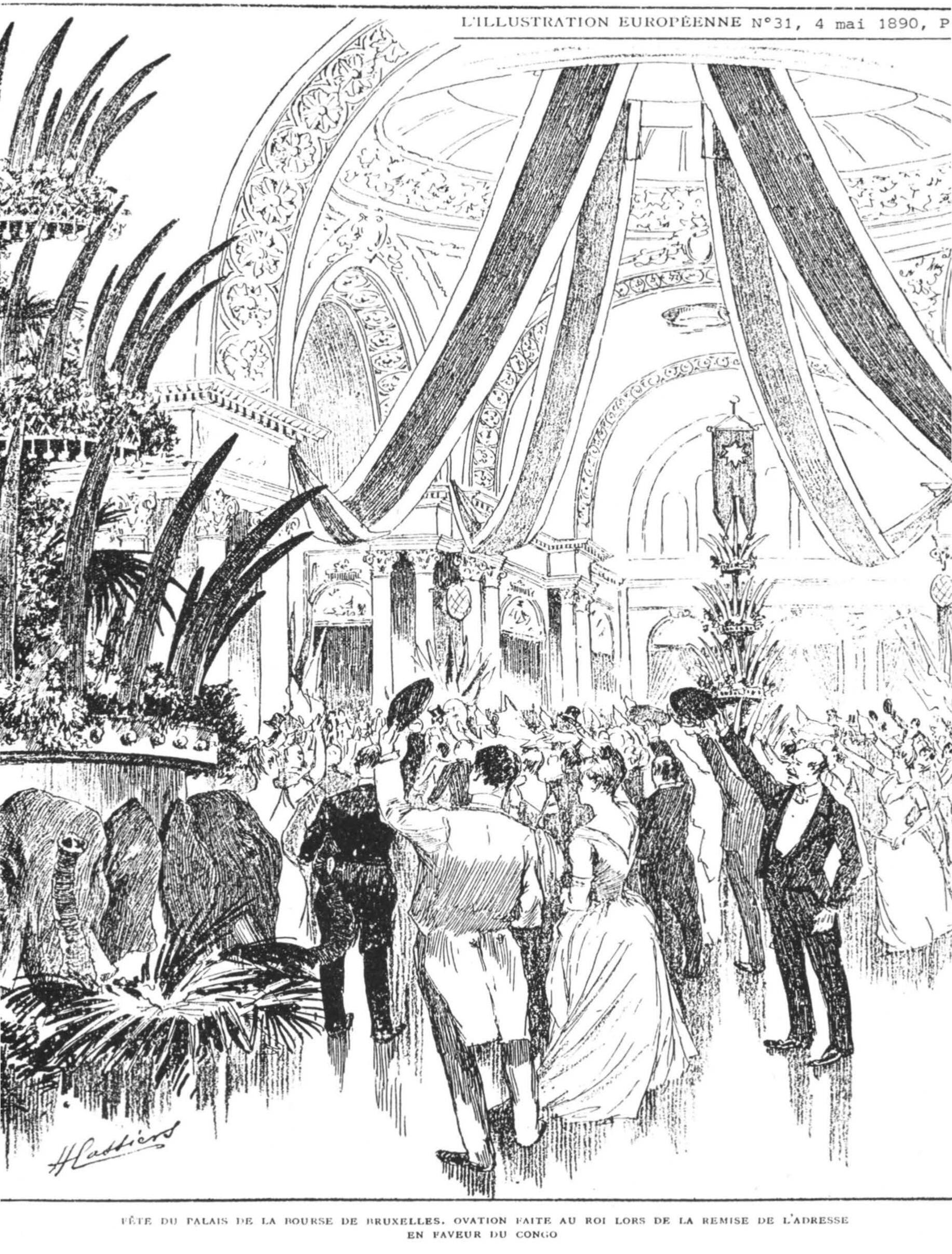
Festival at the Bourse Palace. Ovation for the king during the speech in favour of the Brussels Conference Act of 1890

The Brussels Anti-Slavery Conference of 1889–1890 was held from 18 November 1889 to 2 July 1890 in Brussels and concluded with the adoption of the Brussels Conference Act of 1890 on the prohibition of slave trade and slavery in Africa. The convention favoured colonial policies, justified by the anti-slavery argument. The event and its origins were shaped primarily by a narrow national interest. Governments paid lip service to humanitarian goals in order to legitimize their imperial aims.

== Background ==
=== King Leopold and the Congo Free State ===
Leopold II, the power-thirsty King of the Belgians, had always regretted the restrictions of power imposed on him by his position as a constitutional monarch. He therefore embarked on the project of carving out an absolute monarchy of his own in Africa, which led to the creation of the Congo Free State. Leopold was able to seize the region by convincing other European states at the Berlin Conference on Africa that he was involved in humanitarian and philanthropic work and would not tax trade. Via the International Association of the Congo, he was able to lay claim to most of the Congo Basin. The Congo Free State operated as a separate nation from Belgium in a personal union with its King that was privately controlled by Leopold II although he never personally visited the state.

=== Lavigerie's crusade against slavery ===
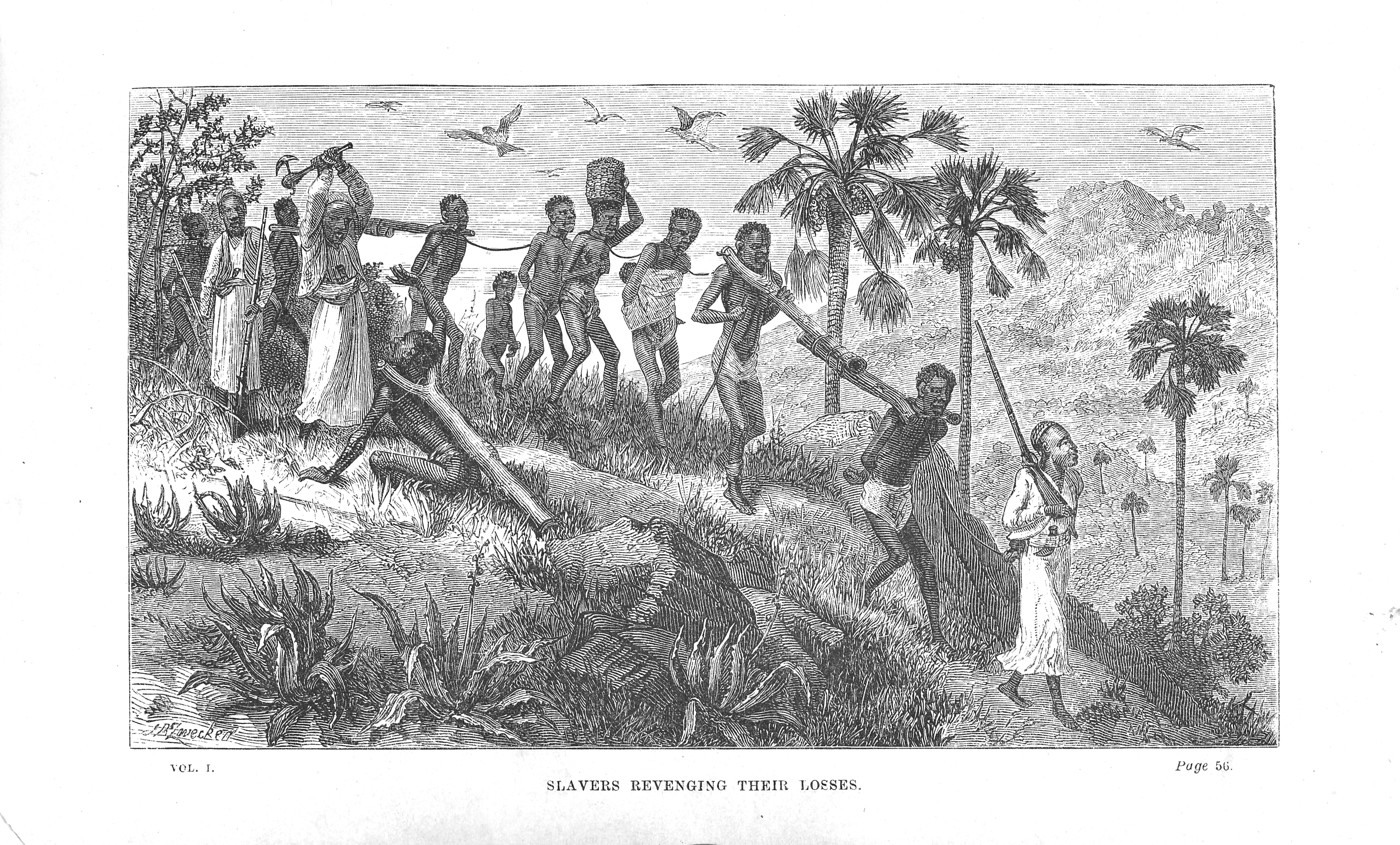
Arab-Swahili slave traders and their captives along the Ruvuma River in Mozambique

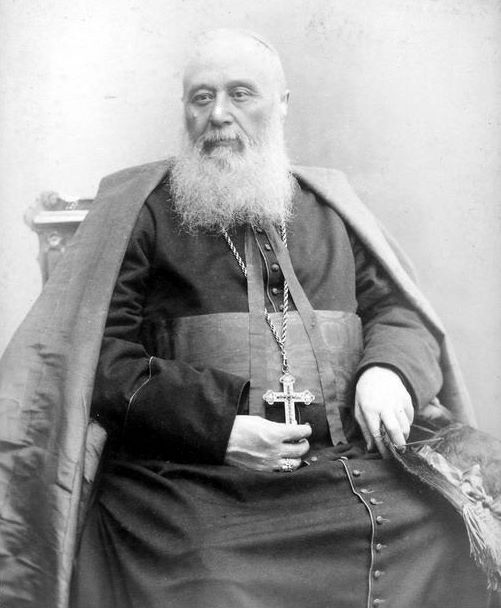
Cardinal Charles Lavigerie, founder of the Missionaries of Africa

During the Scramble for Africa in the mid-1880s, despite the humanitarian promises of the Berlin Colonial Conference, the colonial powers' primary concerns were territorial and economic. That was to change in 1888. In major speeches in Paris and London, Cardinal Charles Lavigerie, who had launched a crusade against slavery, denounced the horrors of the Indian Ocean slave trade, in particular the Zanzibar slave trade. He urged immediate action in the form of an international militia of volunteers to combat the slave trade in East Africa.

Leopold II followed Lavigerie's preaching tour intently. He was particularly concerned by the plans to send out a private international militia. After all, it could mean the conquest of his Congo. Such an army corps, he felt, could be justified only if it was under the leadership of the Congolese government. Leopold also feared that Lavigerie, who in his previous speeches had accused Tippu Tip of slave trading, might harm the Arab policy of his Congo Free State.

After meeting Leopold, however, Lavigerie renounced an international volunteer corps. An anti-slavery expedition was now to be organised by an exclusively national anti-slavery association in consultation with the colonial authorities concerned. In his Brussels speech, Lavigerie pointed sharply to the rampant slave trade in Congo Free State, but he attributed that to a lack of resources.

=== Leading up to the conference ===
Lavigerie's preaching tour would "breath[e] new life into the antislavery movement", and the Anti-Slavery Conference was also a result. European colonisation of East and Central Africa posed a number of problems, especially with the Arab-Swahili power. A clear example was the Arab-Swahili rebellion that led to the blockade of the east coast of Africa by Germany and the United Kingdom.

The Brussels Anti-Slavery Conference also indirectly aided the long ongoing British campaign against the slave trade and slavery in the Ottoman Empire. In anticipation of the Brussels Anti-Slavery Conference, which was due to take place in November 1889, the British diplomatic campaign on the Porte had a breakthrough. The British Foreign Office pointed out to the Porte that the Ottoman Empire would to be met with criticism for its lack of enforcement of the Anglo-Ottoman Convention of 1880 at the upcoming Brussels Anti-Slavery Conference unless it took action before then, but serious anti-slavery action would win European opinion toward the Ottoman Empires. The British diplomatic pressure finally gave results when Sultan Abdul Hamid II introduced the Kanunname of 1889 on 30 December 1889, the first law code, in contrast to previous nominal decrees, formally banning slave trade in the Ottoman Empire.

== The conference ==
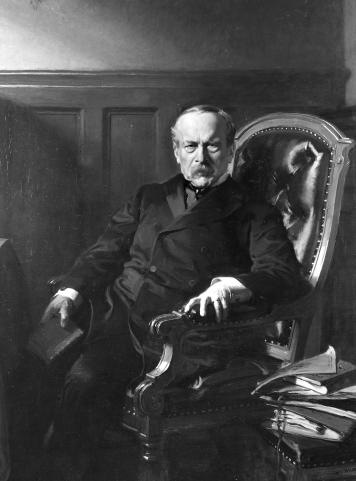
Auguste, Baron Lambermont, led the conference

Britain, after consultation with Germany, requested Belgium to convene an international conference on the slave trade. Belgium had been specially chosen to allay Portuguese and French suspicions. On 18 November 1889, delegates of 17 countries met in Brussels for eight intermittent months. The conference's meetings took place at the Belgian Ministry of Foreign Affairs. Lambermont was appointed president of the conference. The provisions of the General Act to combat the slave trade in the African interior actually amounted to a plan for more colonialism. That was based on the reasoning that anything that contributed to the expansion of European influence should limit the scope of action of the slave traders.

== The Act ==
The General Act of the Brussels Conference stipulated that the organisation of legal, religious and military services in African colonies and protectorates was the best means of combating the slave trade. An important item on the agenda was also the regulation of arms imports. The arms trade strengthened the power of the Arab-Swahilis, and guns and ammunition were also the usual means of exchange to obtain slaves and vice versa.

Effectively combatting the slave trade at required and extensive control of shipping. Earlier in the fight against the Trans-Atlantic slave trade, the British had concluded maritime treaties with a variety of nations to allowed the Royal Navy to examine foreign ships for transporting slaves. England sought a global agreement at the conference that would allow the right of investigation. France, however, had always opposed that right because it gave the superior British a maritime police navy, The Act represented a compromise between the two positions.

Finally, the slave trade could be completely abolished only if the demand for new slaves disappeared. Thus, to eradicate the Indian Ocean slave trade once and for all, slavery had to be abolished in the destination countries themselves. However, the conference did not go that far since only the importation of slaves was addressed. Influenced by the conference, the Ottomans passed a new law that banned the import, transit and export of slaves but left the institution of slavery untouched. Fugitive and illegally-imported slaves had to be issued letters of release.

=== Import duties ===
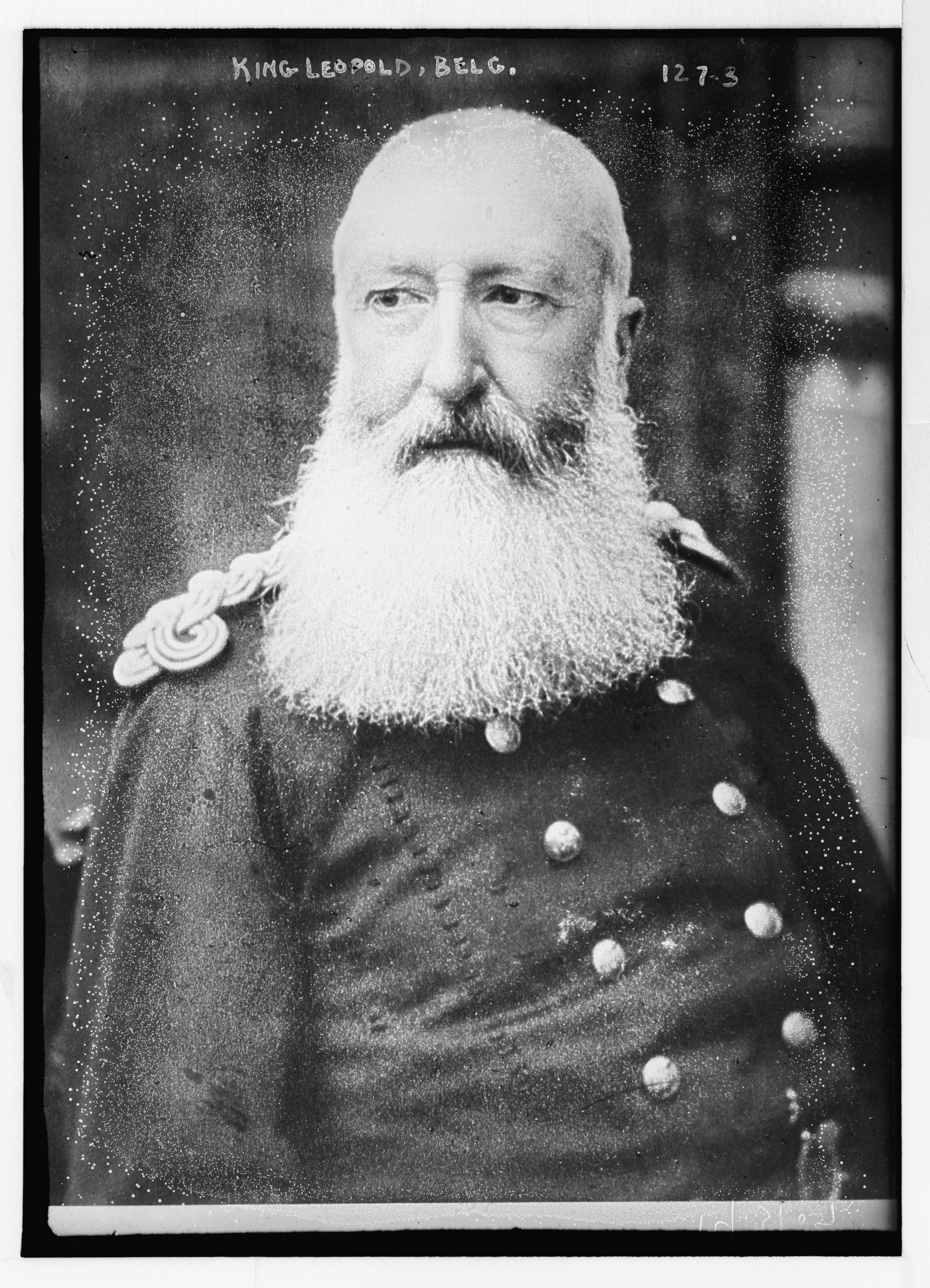
Leopold II, King of the Belgians hosted the Conference.

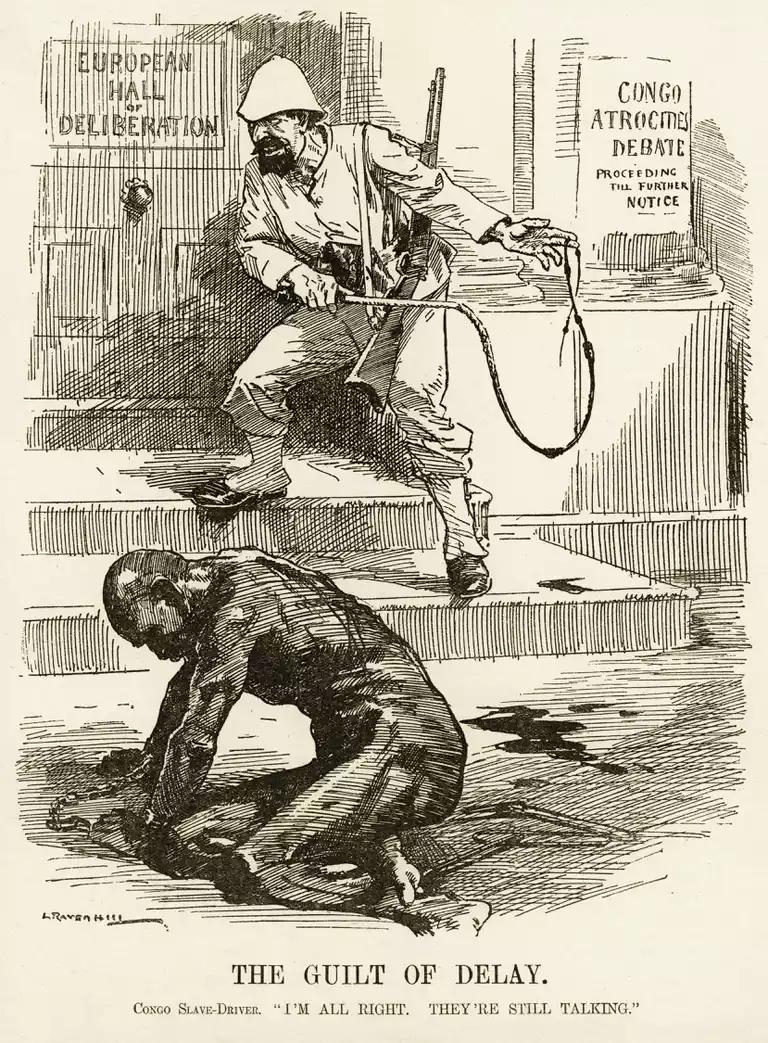
1904 cartoon about the inactivity of international humanitarian politics in the face of the Congo atrocities

Import duties were Leopold's primary concern. The Berlin Act had banned the levying of import duties in the Congo Basin for a period of 20 years, but he now wanted to undo so after only five years.

In a prior correspondence with Britain, Leopold had requested that all countries that had to incur expenses in the fight against the slave trade be allowed to levy a moderate import duty; there was no objection. Leopold therefore wanted that to be included in the conference programme, but Lambermont believed thaty caution was needed. On 10 May, Lambermont submitted the proposal to the conference. He requested the abolition of Article 4 of the Berlin Act and asked for the countries of the conventional Congo basin to be allowed to levy an import duty of up to 10 per cent ad valorem, and a ban or tax on alcohol was also considered, as it was closely linked to the slave trade. The development of public services to support trade required new revenues. Moreover, the countries that were on the front line against the slave trade had to be somewhat accommodated. After all, their humanitarian task cost a great deal of money.

Initially, the Netherlands and the United States opposed the proposal, but after long arduous negotiations and great diplomatic skill on the part of Leopold II, both sides came to an agreement, Leopold II struck home and on 2 July, the general act and declaration of the Brussels Anti-Slavery Conference could finally be signed.

== Consequences ==
Briefly, the conference led to the negotiation of the first treaty abolishing the Indian Ocean slave trade, the Brussels Convention, which was adopted in 1890 and entered into force on 2 April 1892.

On 10 September 1919, the Convention of Saint-Germain-en-Laye 1919 to revise the General Act of Berlin of 1885 and the General Act and Declaration of Brussels of 1890, extended prohibition by securing "the complete suppression of slavery in all its forms and of the slave trade by land and sea", paving the way for the UN Slavery Convention of 25 September 1926.

== Participants ==
State	Participants
Germany	His Excellency Count Friedrich Johann von Alvensleben, German Minister in Brussels. Dr. Arendt, Consul General of Germany in Antwerp.
Austria-Hungary	His Excellency Count Johann Carl Khevenhüller, Austro-Hungarian minister in Brussels.
Belgium	M. le Baron Lambermont, Minister of State. Mr Emile Banning, Director General at the Ministry of Foreign Affairs.
Spain	His Excellency M. Francisco Gutiérrez de Agüera y Bayo, Spanish Minister in Brussels.
Denmark	Mfg Schack De Brockdorff, Consul General of Denmark in Antwerp.
United States	His Excellency Edwin H. Terrell, Minister of the United States of America in Brussels.
France	His Excellency M. Bolrée, French Minister in Brussels. M. Georges Cogordan, Minister Plenipotentiary, deputy director at the Ministry of Foreign Affairs in Paris.
United Kingdom	His Excellency Lord Vivian, British Minister at Brussels. Sir John Kirk, GCMG
Italy	His Excellency Baron De Reinzis, Italian Minister in Brussels.
Netherlands	His Excellency Baron Louis Gericke van Herwijnen, Dutch Minister in Brussels.
Portugal	His Excellency M. Henrique de Macedo Pereira Coutinho, Portuguese Minister in Brussels.
Russia	His Excellency Prince Lev Ouroussov, Russian Minister in Brussels. His Excellency M. De Martens, Permanent Member of the Council of the Russian Ministry of Foreign Affairs.
Sweden–Norway	His Excellency Carl Burenstam, Minister of Sweden and Norway in Brussels.
Congo Free State	Mr. Pirmez, Minister of State, President of the Supreme Council of the Independent State of Congo. Mr. Van Eetvelde, General Administrator of the Department of Foreign Affairs of the Independent State of the Congo.
Ottoman Empire	His Excellency Caratiieodory Efendi, Ottoman minister in Brussels.
Qajar Iran	His Excellency General Nazare Aga, Minister of Persia at Brussels.

== See also ==
- 1926 Slavery Convention
- Belgian Anti-Slavery Society
- Congo–Arab War
- Atrocities in the Congo Free State
- Temporary Slavery Commission, 1924
- Committee of Experts on Slavery, 1932
- Advisory Committee of Experts on Slavery, 1933
- Ad Hoc Committee on Slavery, 1950
