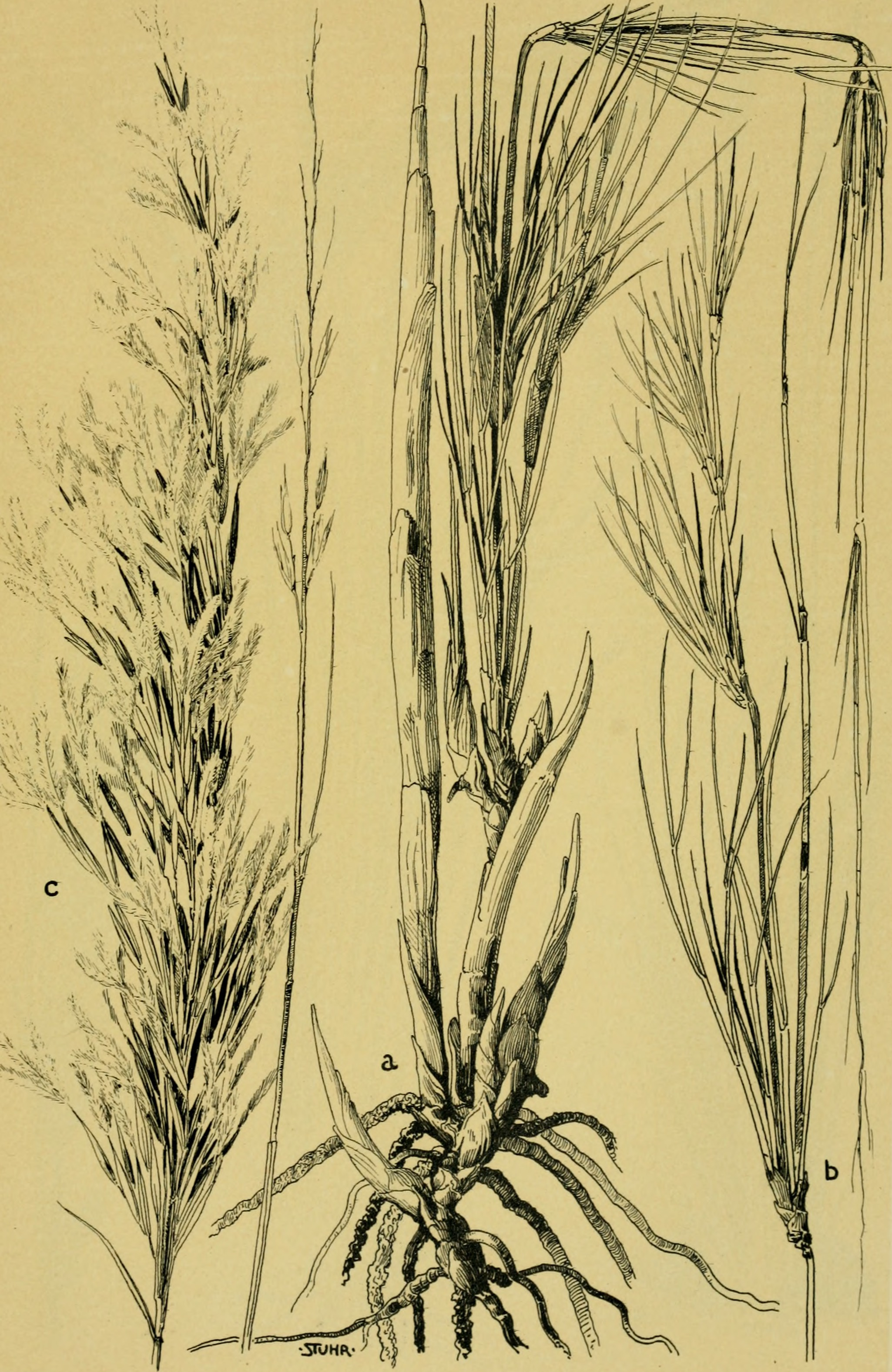

Scientific classification
- Kingdom: Plantae
- Clade: Tracheophytes
- Clade: Angiosperms
- Clade: Monocots
- Clade: Commelinids
- Order: Poales
- Family: Poaceae
- Genus: Stipagrostis
- Species: S. namaquensis

Binomial name
- Stipagrostis namaquensis (Nees) De Winter (1963)

Synonyms
- Arthratherum namaquense Nees (1841); Aristida namaquensis (Nees) Trin. & Rupr. (1842)

= Stipagrostis namaquensis =

Species of grass native to South Africa and Namibia

Stipagrostis namaquensis (river bushman grass; Afrikaans: Steekkweek, "stinging weed") is a species of grass native to Botswana, Namibia, Lesotho, and the Cape Provinces and Free State of South Africa, especially in the Nama Karoo. It is listed as "safe" (LC) on the SANBI Red List.

Stipagrostis namaquensis is a perennial loose tussock with extended rhizomes. The lower sheathes are fuzzy, and the stems are kneaded or upright at 10–20 cm long. The leaf sheaths can be bare or fuzzy, but the leaves stick up 6–10 cm long and measure 1–2 mm wide. The flower is an open or lance-shaped plume if 10–15 cm, and the spines are 10–15 mm long.

African lovegrass is mildly suited to grazing.

	EIW	SWIW	LnregWIW
Grazing Response Index	7	3.8	2.89
