= Mayda Doris Henderson =

South African botanist

Mayda Doris de Winter
- Born: Mayda Doris Henderson; 3 February 1928
- Died: 3 September 2015 (aged 87); Cape Town
- Education: Rhodes University
- Spouse: Bernard de Winter
- Scientific career
- Fields: Botany

Mayda Doris Henderson (3 February 1928 – 3 September 2015, in Cape Town) was a South African botanist, phytogeographer, and taxonomist. She studied at Rhodes University and was best known for her articles published in Kirkia; The Zimbabwe Journal of Botany. She was the recipient of a Southern Africa Medal.

The standard author abbreviation M.D.Hend. is used to indicate this person as the author when citing a botanical name. She was active as a taxonomist from 1954 to 1963.

== Selected publications ==
- Dyer, R. A.; Henderson, Mayda; Killick, D. J. B.; Meeuse, A. D. J.; Verdcourt, B.; Codd, L. E. (19 November 1958). "New and Interesting Records of African Flowering Plants". Bothalia. 7 (1). South African National Biodiversity Institute: 21–39. doi:10.4102/abc.v7i1.1646. ISSN 2311-9284.

== Sources ==
- Catalogue of Portraits of Naturalists, Mostly Botanists in the Collections of the Hunt Institute, the Linnean Society of London, and the Conservatoire Et Jardin Botaniques de la Ville de Genève: Portraits on individuals, E-H. Hunt Institute for Botanical Documentation, Carnegie Mellon University. 1987. p. 565. ISBN 978-0-913196-50-2.
