= Stipagrostis hirtigluma =

Scientific classification
- Kingdom: Plantae
- Clade: Tracheophytes
- Clade: Angiosperms
- Clade: Monocots
- Clade: Commelinids
- Order: Poales
- Family: Poaceae
- Genus: Stipagrostis
- Species: S. hirtigluma

Binomial name
- Stipagrostis hirtigluma (Steud. ex Trin. & Rupr.) De Winter

Synonyms
- Arthratherum hirtiglume (Steud. ex Trin. & Rupr.) Jaub. & Spach

Species of grass

Stipagrostis hirtigluma (Afrikaans: bloutwa) is a densely tufted perennial grass. It occurs across most of Africa east to Pakistan in bushveld, karoo, and desert regions. In Namibia, it grows in dry, warm parts, in stony or sandy places and on rocky outcrops.

There are three subspecies of Stipagrostis hirtigluma:

- Stipagrostis hirtigluma subsp. hirtigluma (Steud. ex Trin. & Rupr.) De Winter – most of Africa through Middle East to South Asia (Pakistan)
- Stipagrostis hirtigluma subsp. patula (Hack.) De Winter – southern Africa, from Angola to Mozambique and south
- Stipagrostis hirtigluma var. pearsonii (Henrard) De Winter – Angola and Namibia

Stipa hirtigluma subsp. hirtigluma and S. h. subsp. pearsonii display many similarities.
