= Kirkia dewinteri =

Conservation status
- Least Concern (IUCN 3.1)

Scientific classification
- Kingdom: Plantae
- Clade: Tracheophytes
- Clade: Angiosperms
- Clade: Eudicots
- Clade: Rosids
- Order: Sapindales
- Family: Kirkiaceae
- Genus: Kirkia
- Species: K. dewinteri

Binomial name
- Kirkia dewinteri Merxm. & Heine

Species of tree

Kirkia dewinteri is a small tree in the Kirkiaceae, endemic to the dry savanna of the Kaokoveld in Namibia. This rare species is found on rocky outcrops, usually growing into a 5-metre (16 ft) tall tree. Bark is yellow with blackish spots. Fruit a small woody capsule splitting into four valves.
