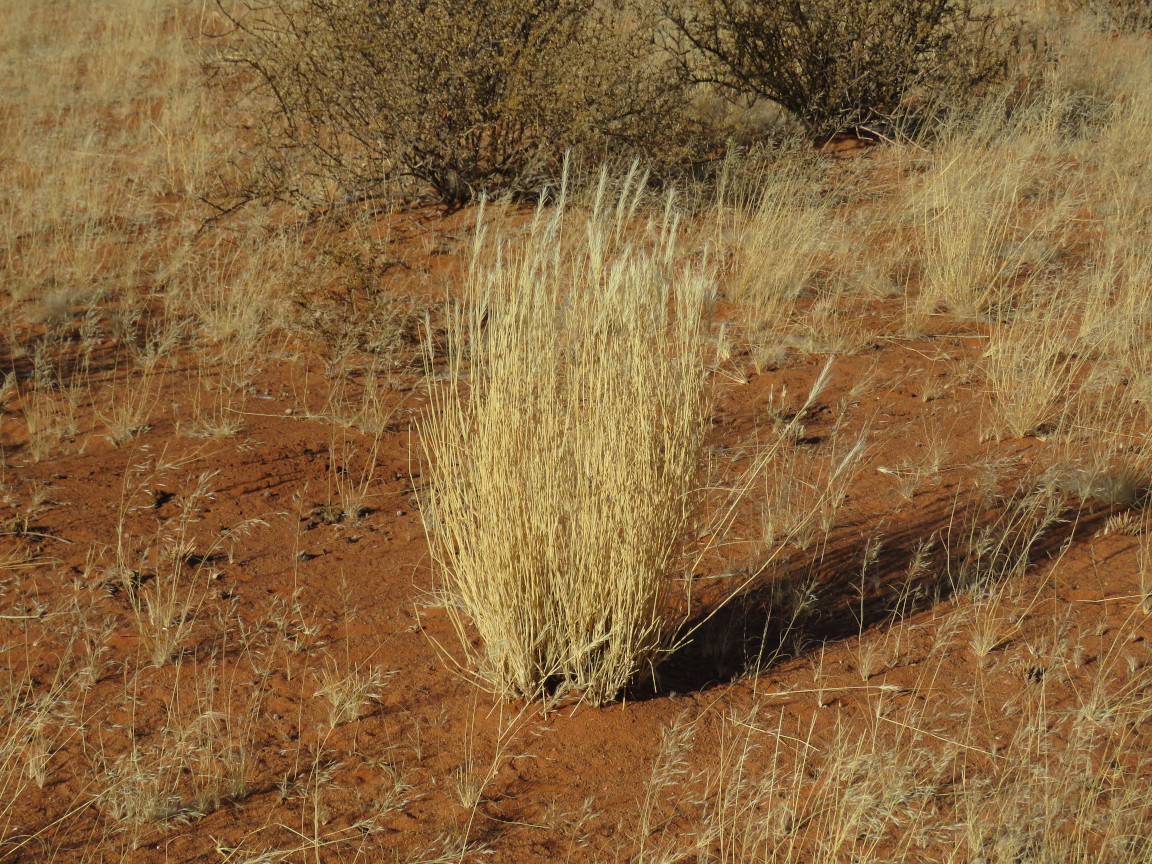

Scientific classification
- Kingdom: Plantae
- Clade: Tracheophytes
- Clade: Angiosperms
- Clade: Monocots
- Clade: Commelinids
- Order: Poales
- Family: Poaceae
- Genus: Stipagrostis
- Species: S. ciliata

Binomial name
- Stipagrostis ciliata (Desf.) De Winter

Synonyms
- Aristida ciliata

= Stipagrostis ciliata =

Species of grass

Stipagrostis ciliata, the tall bushman grass, is a species of grass in the family Poaceae. The native range is from the Canary Islands, the Sahara desert to Pakistan. It occurs in Namibia's Namib Desert and the Kalahari. The grass grows 30–100 centimetres (12–39 in) tall and can be annual or perennial dependent on the amount of rainfall. It can be distinguished by a ring of long white hair surrounding each node.
