= Edwin H. Terrell =

American diplomat (1848–1910)

Edwin Holland Terrell
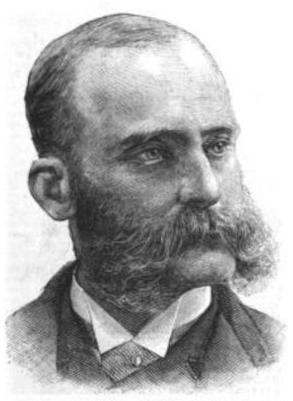

United States Minister to Belgium
- In office April 1, 1889 – June 22, 1893
- Preceded by: John Gibson Parkhurst
- Succeeded by: James Stevenson Ewing

Personal details
- Born: November 21, 1848 Brookville, Indiana, US
- Died: July 1, 1910 (aged 61) San Antonio, Texas, US

Edwin Holland Terrell (November 21, 1848 – July 1, 1910) was an American diplomat who served as United States Minister to Belgium from April 1, 1889, to June 22, 1893.

== Early life and education ==
Edwin Holland Terrell was born on November 21, 1848, in Brookville, Indiana. He was the son of Martha Jarrell Terrell and Williamson Terrell. On September 8, 1849, his mother died. Terrell was 9 months old. His father was a Methodist minister and could no longer support Terrell. Terrell was adopted by the family of George Holland, an attorney from Richmond, Indiana. Terrell graduated from DePauw University in 1871. Terrell graduated as a valedictorian.

== Early career ==
In 1871 Terrell moved to Texas to accompany his brother, then a colonel in the United States Army. In 1872 Terrell accompanied his brother to Omaha, Nebraska, and in 1873 graduated from Harvard Law School before studying abroad in France. In 1874 Terrell began to practice law at the firm Barbour, Jacobs, and Terrell in Indianapolis, Indiana. In 1877 Terrell moved back to San Antonio, Texas. Terrell was Vice President of the San Antonio Gas Company and also was an advocate for creation of the San Antonio and Aransas Pass Railway. In 1887 Terrell was defeated for Mayor of San Antonio.

== Diplomatic career ==
On April 1, 1889, Terrell was named United States Minister to Belgium. Terrell served as ambassador to Belgium until June 22, 1893. In 1891, Terrell made a treaty with Belgian King Leopold II. In addition to serving as ambassador to Belgium, Terrell served as the United States representative to the Brussels Anti-Slavery Conference 1889–90, International Conference on Customs tariffs of 1890, and International Monetary Conference of 1892.

== Political career ==
Terrell was a delegate to the 1880 Republican National Convention, 1888 Republican National Convention and 1904 Republican National Convention.

== Personal life ==
Terrell married Mary Maverick, the daughter of Samuel Maverick of whom the term “maverick” comes from on August 17, 1874. They had six children. After her death in January 1891, Terrell married Lois Lasaster on February 7, 1895. They had three children.

== Death ==
Terrell died on July 1, 1910.
