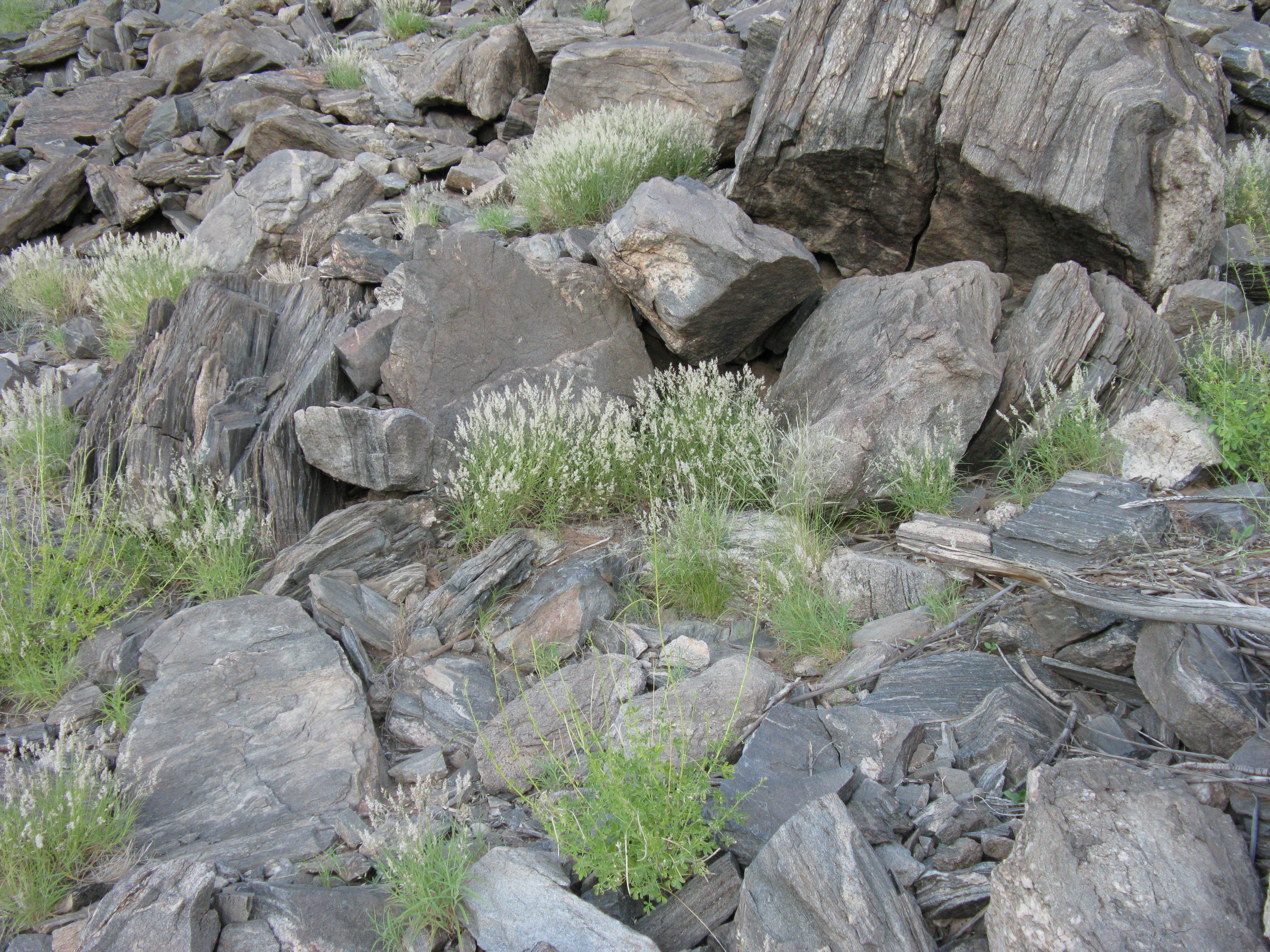

Scientific classification
- Kingdom: Plantae
- Clade: Tracheophytes
- Clade: Angiosperms
- Clade: Monocots
- Clade: Commelinids
- Order: Poales
- Family: Poaceae
- Genus: Stipagrostis
- Species: S. obtusa

Binomial name
- Stipagrostis obtusa Delile Nees

= Stipagrostis obtusa =

Species of plant

Stipagrostis obtusa (Afrikaans: kortbeen boesmangras, Khoekhoe: ǂhabob, Hebrew: מלענן ריסני) is a perennial grass belonging to the grass family (Poaceae). It is a widespread species, being native to North Africa, Mauritania, Chad, Ethiopia, Southern Africa, Western Asia, the Arabian Peninsula and Pakistan.

Stipagrostis obtusa is used as fodder grass in Namibia, it can survive on an annual rainfall of about 150 millimetres (5.9 in).
