= John Kirk (explorer) =

British explorer and diplomat (1832–1922)

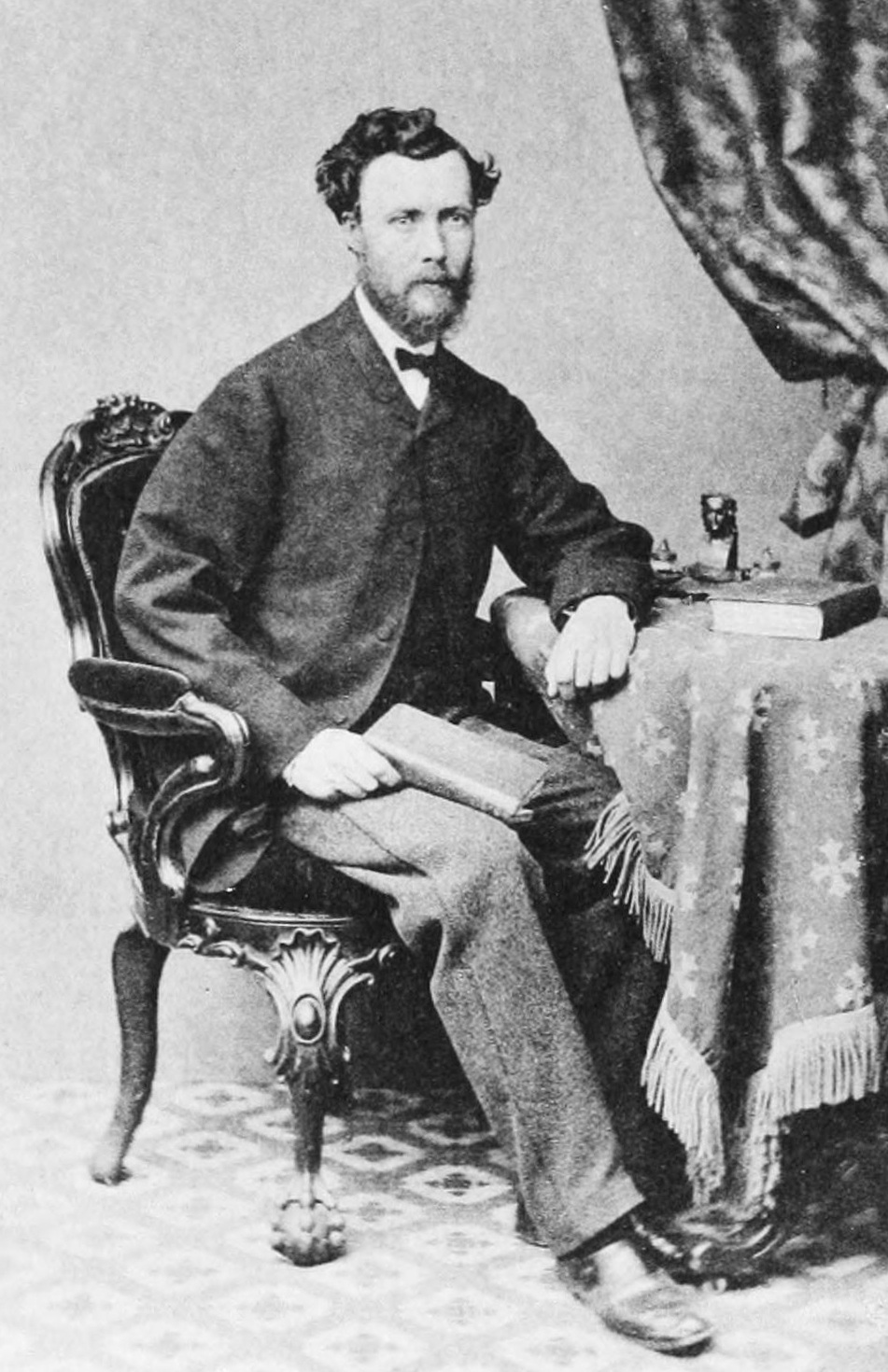
John Kirk

Sir John Kirk GCMG, KCB, FRS (19 December 1832 – 15 January 1922) was a British physician, naturalist, companion to explorer David Livingstone, and a British administrator in Zanzibar, East Africa, where he was instrumental in ending the slave trade in that country.

== Early life and education ==
He was born on 19 December 1832 in Barry, Angus, near Arbroath, Scotland, the second of four children of the Rev John Kirk (1795-1858) and his wife Christian Guthrie Carnegie (1803-1865). Kirk earned his medical degree from the University of Edinburgh, presenting his thesis On Functional Disease of the Heart. Kirk worked for a year as a doctor in the Edinburgh Royal Infirmary before volunteering for the Crimean War.

== Family ==
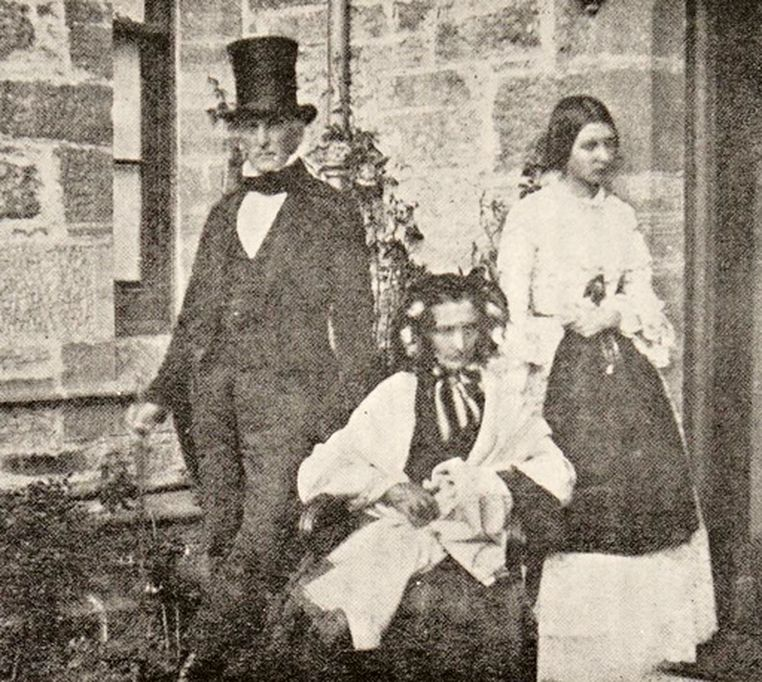
Parents of John Kirk, photographed by John Kirk

Kirk's daughter, Helen, married Major-General Henry Brooke Hagstromer Wright CB CMG, the brother of the famous bacteriologist and immunologist, Sir Almroth Edward Wright and of Sir Charles Theodore Hagberg Wright, Secretary and Librarian of London Library. Kirk's son Colonel John William Carnegie Kirk was the author of "A British Garden Flora". The engineer, Alexander Carnegie Kirk, was John Kirk's elder brother.

== Career ==
=== Explorer ===
From 1858 to 1864, John Kirk worked with Dr David Livingstone on the Second Zambezi Expedition as a botanist. This visit later encouraged his work to end the East African slave trade. In this trip, they visited the Zomba Plateau and Lake Chilwa in present-day Malawi, and in September 1859 he and Livingstone travelled up the Shire River to Lake Malawi, which they explored by boat. Kirk found Livingstone an inept leader and in 1862 wrote, "I can come to no other conclusion than that Dr. Livingstone is out of his mind and the most unsafe leader".

The Kirk Range, which lies west of the Shire River and forms part of the Malawi-Mozambique border, is named after Kirk.

In 1866, Livingstone began his next and final expedition, to find the source of the Nile, from Zanzibar. From Livingstone's subsequent correspondence during the expedition it seems that Kirk remained in Zanzibar and did not continue with the rest of the party. After Livingstone's death in 1873, Kirk pledged to continue his work to end the East African slave trade.

==== Visit to Somali lands ====
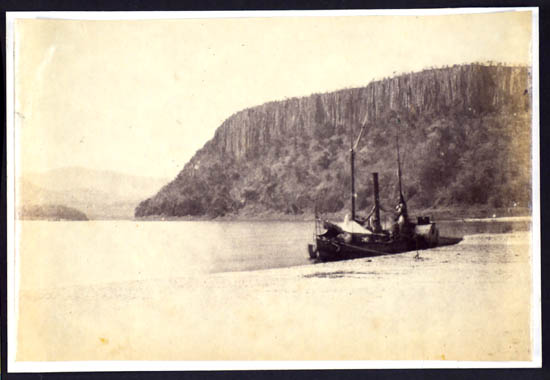
Dr Livingstone's ship the Ma Robert, photographed on the Zambesi at Lupata by John Kirk

Kirk arrived in southern Somalia in 1873 during a period of great economic prosperity with the region being dominated by the Geledi Sultanate and the Hiraab Imamate. Trade between the ports of Mogadishu, Merca and the interior Geledi Sultanate flourished during Geledi Sultan Ahmed Yusuf's reign. Kirk noted a variety of other things. Roughly 20 large dhows were docked in both Mogadishu and Merka respectively filled with grain produced from the farms of the Geledi in the interior. Kirk met the Hirab Imam Mahmood who reigned over Mogadishu. The Shabelle river itself was referred to as the 'Geledi river' by Kirk, perhaps in respect of the sheer volume of produce that the Sultanate output. In Barawa there was little grain instead a large quantity of ivory and skins which had already been loaded onto ships destined for Zanzibar. He stated that Sultan Ahmed Yusuf controlled a vast territory stretching from Mogadishu to the Jubba region and had 50,000 troops at his command.

=== Diplomat ===
From his appointment in 1865 the British Consul in Zanzibar, Henry Adrian Churchill worked on the abolition of the slave trade on the island, however his heavy workload and the adverse climate took a toll on his health in 1869 and Kirk, who was his physician and Vice Consul, advised him to leave for London for the sake of his health. Churchill left in December 1870 leaving Kirk to undertake his duties as acting Consul.

Kirk continued Churchill's work on the slave trade and in June 1873 he received simultaneous contradictory instructions from London on the Zanzibar slave trade, one to issue an ultimatum to Sultan Bargash, under threat of blockade that the slave trade should be stopped and the slave market closed, and the other not to enforce a blockade which might be taken as an act of war pushing Zanzibar towards French protection. Kirk only showed the first instruction to Barghash, who capitulated within two weeks.

In August 1873 he was appointed British Consul-General in Zanzibar in 1875 he was appointed Consul in the Comoro Islands, and in 1880 was additionally appointed Political Agent in Zanzibar. One of his Vice-Consuls, appointed in 1883, was Lieutenant Charles Stewart Smith, who had earlier served in the anti-slaving patrols launched from HMS London. For years he negotiated with Sultan Barghash, gaining his confidence and promising to help enrich the East African domain through legitimate commerce. By 1885 the region was larger and more profitable.

He was British Minister Plenipotentiary at the 1890 Slave Act Conference in Brussels.

== Other interests ==
=== Botany ===
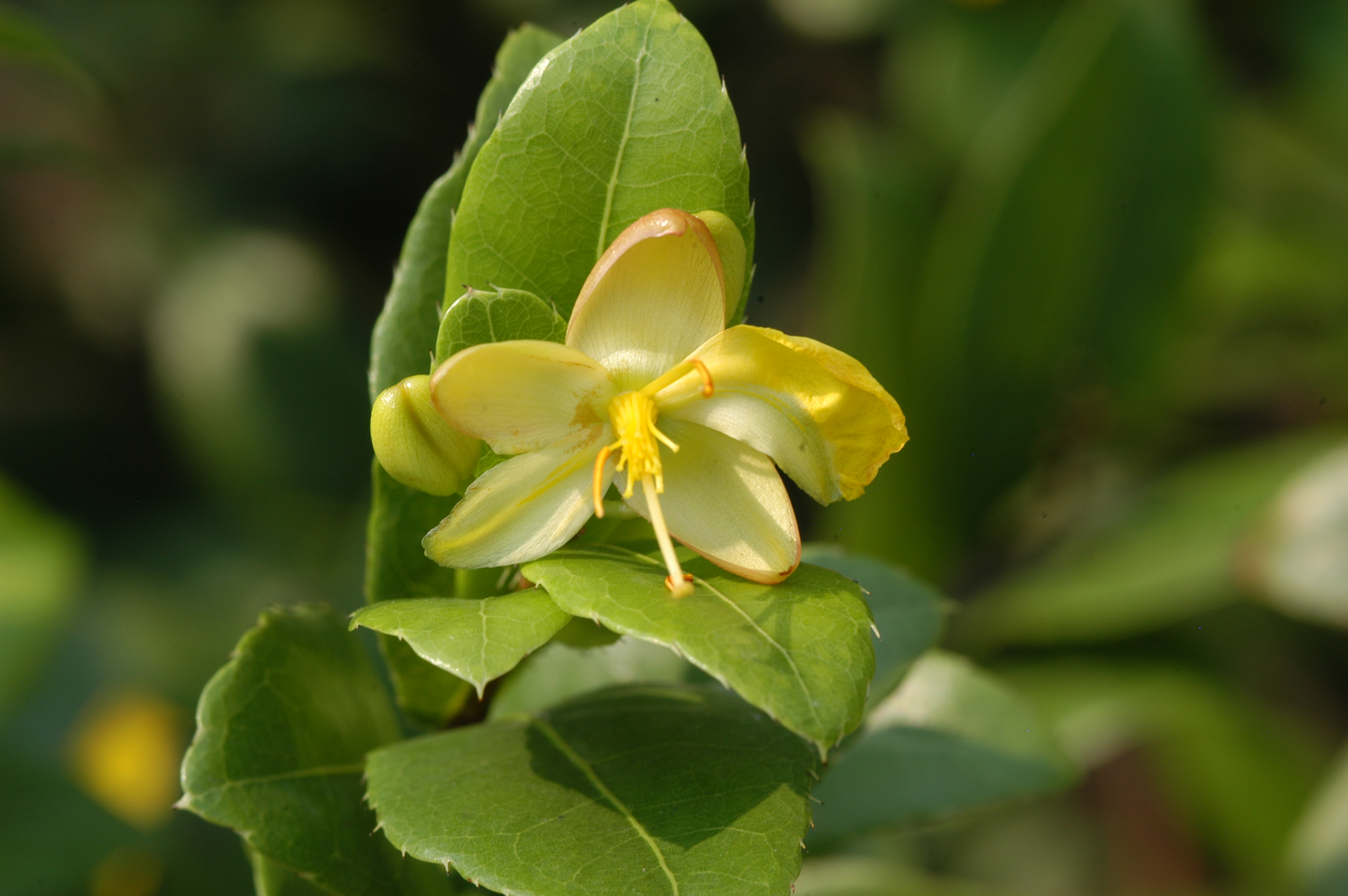
Ochna kirkii

He was a keen botanist throughout his life and published many papers from his findings in East Africa. He was highly regarded by successive directors of the Royal Botanic Gardens, Kew: William Hooker, Joseph Dalton Hooker and William Turner Thiselton-Dyer.

He introduced a very distinct and pretty species of orchid to the United Kingdom, subsequently named Angraecum scottianum.

==== Eponyms ====
Kirkia which is a genus of plant in family Kirkiaceae. It was previously placed in family Simaroubaceae, but was transferred into Kirkiaceae, together with Pleiokirkia, it was published by Oliv. in Hooker's Icon. Pl. vol.11 on page 26 in 1868.

Also, Gossypioides kirkii, a new species of cotton from East Tropical Africa, Ochna kirkii, an evergreen shrub, and Uapaca kirkiana, a miombo woodland tree of southern Africa, were named after him.

Specimens collected by Kirk are cared for at herbaria including the National Herbarium of Victoria (MEL), Royal Botanic Gardens Victoria.

=== Zoology ===
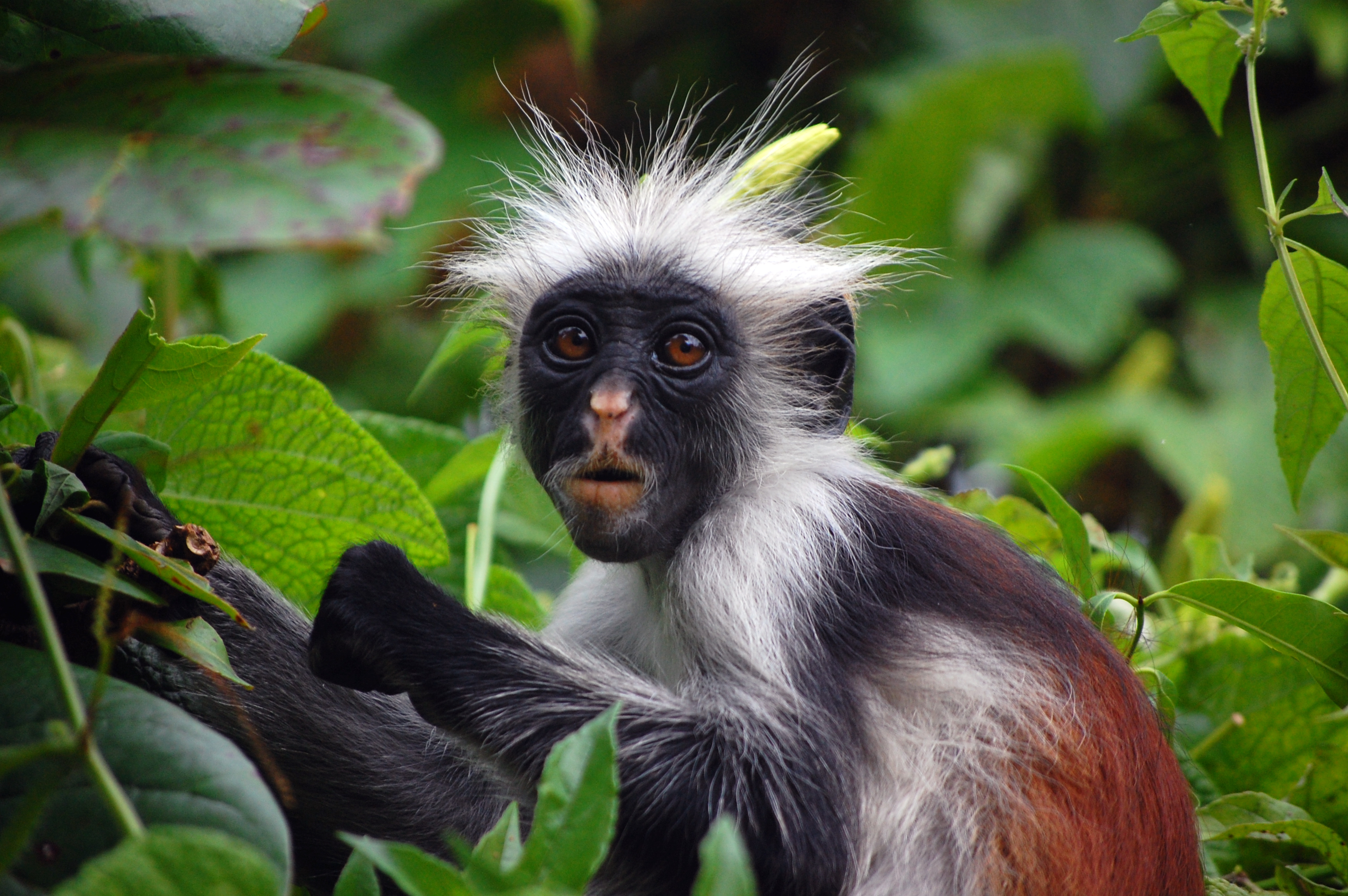
Kirk's red colobus of Zanzibar, Procolobus kirkii, taken at Jozani Forest, Zanzibar, Tanzania.

He studied the wildlife in East Africa and published many papers. He collected many birds from Zanzibar and East Africa. In 1892, he was credited with the third largest elephant tusk among animal trophy hunters.

He collected many specimens of Lake Malawi fish on the Zambezi expedition.

==== Eponyms ====
According to sources, Kirk first drew zoologists' attention to the Zanzibar red colobus, which is also commonly known as Kirk's red colobus. This species, Procolobus kirkii, which is endemic to Zanzibar, is named after him, as is the dwarf antelope Kirk's dik-dik.

Also, a species of

- African lizard, Agama kirkii, is named in his honour,

as is a species of

- African amphibian, Kirk's caecilian (Scolecomorphus kirkii) and the
- fish Kirk's blenny (Alticus kirkii).
- The Lake Malawi Cichlid fish Protomelas kirkii is named after Kirk.

=== Photography ===
Kirk photographed many scenes and people during his travels in East Africa. Examples include "Hamed bin Muhammed, slave and ivory trader", "Female retainers of Swahili household in gala dress", and "A panoramic view of Zanzibar".

== Awards and decorations ==
- Companion of the Order of St Michael and St George, Third Class, 1879.
- Companion of the Order of St Michael and St George, Second Class, 1881.
- Patron's Medal of the Royal Geographical Society, 1882, "for unremitting services to Geography, as a naturalist, as second-in-command to Dr. Livingstone, and as H.M. Consul-General at Zanzibar,"
- Companion of the Order of St Michael and St George, First Class, 1886.
- Knight Commander of the Order of the Bath.

== Death ==
He died on 15 January 1922 aged 89, and was buried in St. Nicholas' churchyard in Sevenoaks, Kent, England.

== Bibliography ==
- McMullen, Michael D. (2004). Kirk, Sir John Oxford dictionary of national biography : in association with the British Academy : from the earliest times to the year 2000. Vol. XXXI. Oxford: Oxford University Press. pp. 771–772.
- Blakie, William Garden (1880). Personal life of David Livingstone, chiefly from his unpublished journals and correspondance in the possession of his family. London: John Murray.
- Kirk J (1864). "Account of the Zambezi District, in South Africa, with a Notice of Its Vegetable and Other Products". Transactions of the Botanical Society 8: 197–202.
- Kirk J (1864-1865). "Ascent of the Rovuma". Proceedings of the Royal Geographical Society of London 9: 284–288.
- Kirk J (1865). "Dimorphism in the Flowers of Monochoria Vaginalis ". Journal of the Linnean Society: Botany 8: 147.
- Kirk J (1859). "Extracts of a Letter of Dr. Kirk to Alex Kirk, Esq., Relating to the Livingstone Expedition". Report of the British Association for the Advancement of Science. pp. 185–186.
- Kirk J (1864). "Hints to Travellers – Extracts from a Letter from John Kirk". Journal of the Royal Geographical Society 34: 290–292.
- Kirk J (1865). "Letter Dated 28 February Replying to Dr. Peters". Proceedings of the Zoological Society of London 1865: 227.
- Kirk J (1862). "Letter from Dr. John Kirk (of the Livingstone Expedition), Dated H.M. Ship Pioneer, River Shire, East Africa, 14 December 1861". Transactions of the Botanical Society 7: 389–392.
- Kirk J (1859). "Letter from Dr. John Kirk, Physician and Naturalists to the Livingstone Expedition, Relative to the Country near Lake Shirwa, in Africa". Transactions of the Botanical Society 6: 317–321 + Plate VII.
- Kirk J(1864). "Letter from John Kirk to Professor Balfour". Transactions of the Botanical Society 8: 110–111.
- Kirk J (1864). "List of Mammalia Met with in Zambesia, East Tropical Africa". Proceedings of the Zoological Society of London 1864: 649–660.
- Kirk J (1865). "Notes on the Gradient of the Zambesi, on the Level of Lake Nyassa, on the Murchison Rapids, and on Lake Shirwa". Journal of the Royal Geographical Society 35: 167–169.
- Kirk J (1865). "Notes on Two Expeditions up the River Rovuma, East Africa". Journal of the Royal Geographical Society 35: 154–167.
- Kirk J (1864). "On a Few Fossil Bones from the Alluvial Strata of the Zambesi Delta". Journal of the Royal Geographical Society 34: 199–201.
- Kirk J (1867). "On a New Dye-Wood of the Genus Cudranea, from Tropical Africa". Journal of the Linnean Society: Botany 9: 229–230.
- Kirk J (1864). "On a New Genus of Liliaceæ from East Tropical Africa". Transactions of the Linnean Society 24: 497–499.
- Kirk J (1866-1867). "On a New Harbour Opposite Zanzibar". Proceedings of the Royal Geographical Society of London 11: 35–36.
- Kirk J (1867). "On Musa Livingstoniana, a New Banana from Tropical Africa". Journal of the Linnean Society: Botany 9: 128.
- Kirk J (1865). "On the "Tsetse" Fly of Tropical Africa (Glossina morsitans, Westwood)". Journal of the Linnean Society: Zoology 8: 149–156.
- Kirk J (1864). "On the Birds of the Zambezi Region of Eastern Tropical Africa". Ibis 6: 307–339.
- Kirk J (1867). "On the Palms of East Tropical Africa". Journal of the Linnean Society: Botany 9: 230–235.
- Kirk J (1861-1862). "Report on the Natural Products and Capabilities of the Shire and Lower Zambesi Valleys". Proceedings of the Royal Geographical Society of London 6: 25–32.
- Kirk J (1896). Report by Sir John Kirk on the Disturbances at Brass. Great Britain: Colonial Office.
- Waller, Horace (1874). The Last Journals of David Livingstone in Central Africa, from 1865 to his Death, Continued by a Narrative of His Last Moments and Sufferings, Obtained from his Faithful Servants, Chuma and Susi. London: John Murray. ISBN 9780837138992.
