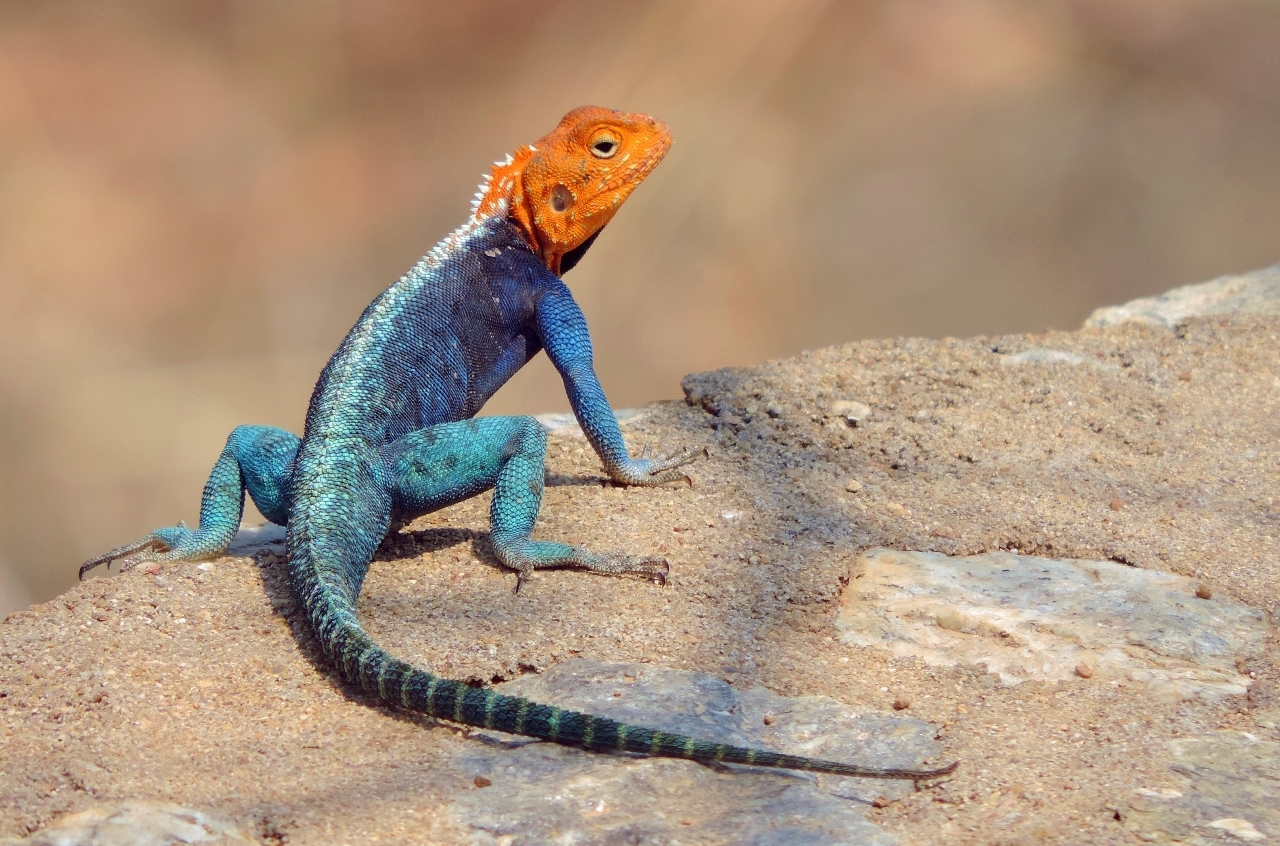

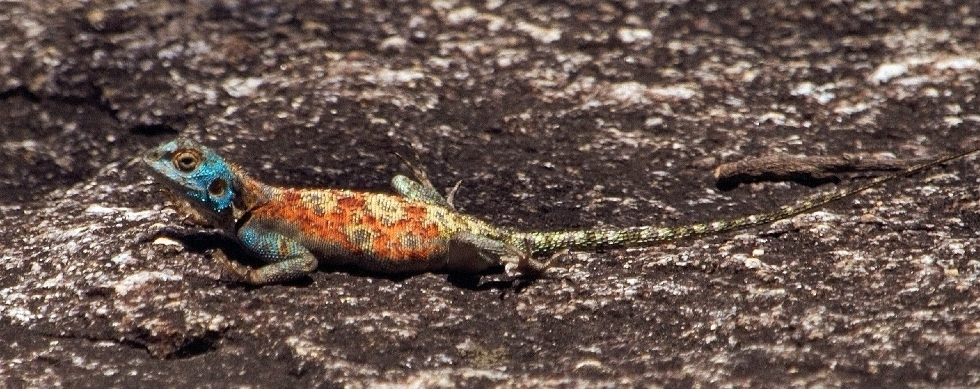
- Male (top) and female (bottom)

Conservation status
- Least Concern (IUCN 3.1)

Scientific classification
- Kingdom: Animalia
- Phylum: Chordata
- Class: Reptilia
- Order: Squamata
- Suborder: Iguania
- Family: Agamidae
- Genus: Agama
- Species: A. kirkii

Binomial name
- Agama kirkii Boulenger, 1885

= Agama kirkii =

Species of lizard

Agama kirkii, also known commonly as Kirk's rock agama, is a small species of lizard in the family Agamidae. The species is native to southeastern Africa. There are two recognized subspecies.

== Etymology ==
The specific name, kirkii, is in honor of British naturalist John Kirk.

== Description ==
Adults of A. kirkii usually have a total length of 20–28 cm (7.9–11.0 in) of which 60–70% is the long tail. Maximum recorded total length is 30 cm (12 in). In displaying males, the head is orange, and the body is blue. In breeding females, the head is turquoise, and the body is yellowish gray.

== Geographic range ==
A. kirkii is found in Botswana, Malawi, Mozambique, Tanzania, Zambia, and Zimbabwe.

== Habitat ==
The preferred natural habitat of A. kirkii is rocky areas of savanna.

== Behavior ==
A. kirkii is terrestrial and rupicolous (rock-dwelling). It lives in colonies with a dominant male, and is diurnal.

== Diet ==
A. kirkii preys predominately upon ants, but also eats other insects and other arthropods.

== Reproduction ==
A. kirkii is oviparous. The average clutch size is ten eggs, and the average length (including tail) of each hatchling is 6.5 cm (2.6 in).

== Subspecies ==
Two subspecies are recognized as being valid, including the nominotypical subspecies.

- Agama kirkii fitzsimonsi Loveridge, 1950
- Agama kirkii kirkii Boulenger, 1885
