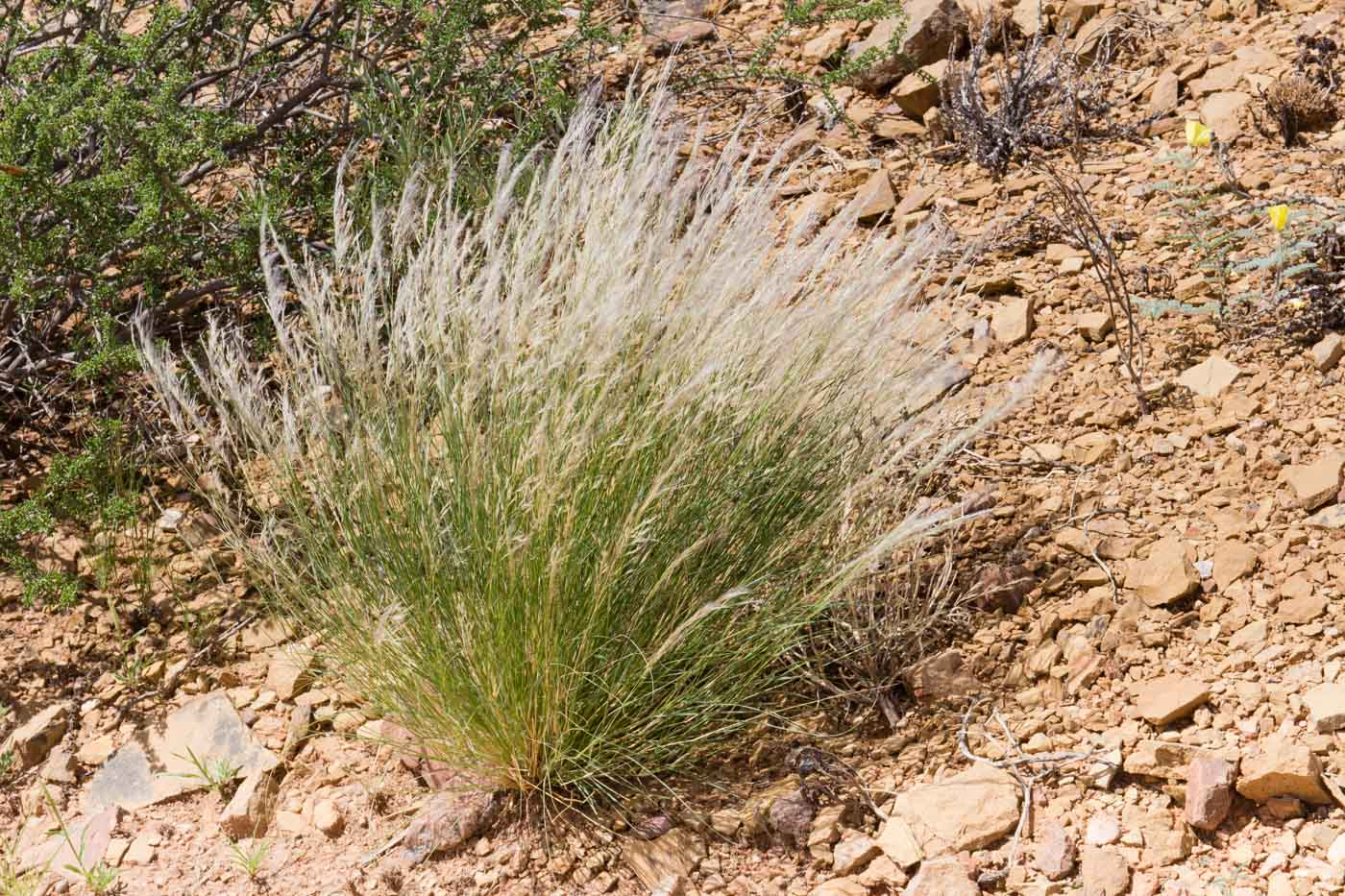

Scientific classification
- Kingdom: Plantae
- Clade: Tracheophytes
- Clade: Angiosperms
- Clade: Monocots
- Clade: Commelinids
- Order: Poales
- Family: Poaceae
- Genus: Stipagrostis
- Species: S. uniplumis

Binomial name
- Stipagrostis uniplumis (Licht.) De Winter

= Stipagrostis uniplumis =

Species of plant

Stipagrostis uniplumis (Afrikaans: blinkaar-boesmangras) is a perennial grass belonging to the grass family (Poaceae). It is the most common of the Stipagrostis species and occurs in most of the arid parts of Africa as far north as Senegal and Somalia.

It is essentially not a good grazing grass with its tough, wiry leaves, it is relatively well grazed in very dry regions and distributed areas, where it can dominate.
