= Bernard de Winter =

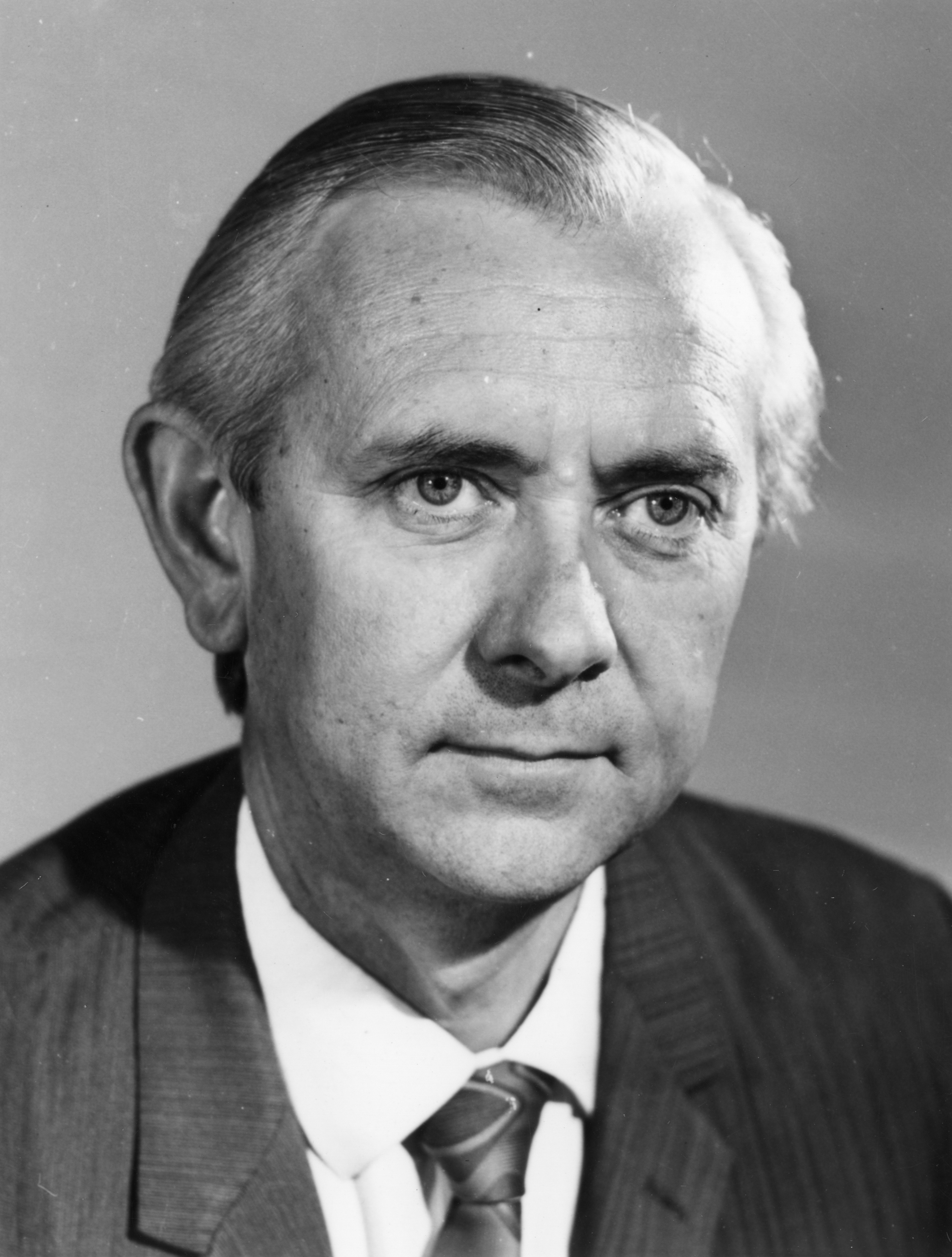
- Born: 31 July 1924
- Died: 8 May 2017 (aged 92); Pretoria
- Education: Pretoria University
- Spouse: Mayda Doris de Winter
- Scientific career
- Fields: Botany

Bernard de Winter (31 July 1924 - 8 May 2017 Pretoria) was a South African botanist who from 1973 was Director of the Botanical Research Institute, which later became the National Botanical Institute and then the South African National Biodiversity Institute.

He attended Pretoria University from 1942 to 1946, and was awarded an MSc in 1947. After teaching for a period, he joined the staff of the National Herbarium, and was made Officer in Charge of Botanical Survey in 1959, and Assistant Director in 1963. His main contributions to botany have been publications on Ebenaceae and Gramineae, especially the genus Eragrostis.

He is commemorated in Kirkia dewinteri, Aloe dewinteri, Silene dewinteri and other taxa. The Pedaliaceae genus of Dewinteria is named after him, with the single curious species D. petrophila from the Kaokoveld in Namibia.

His collection of some 9 500 specimens is housed in Pretoria with duplicates in several herbaria including Kew and Windhoek. They were collected between 1947 and 1975 on his own or together with Willi Giess, D. S. Hardy, O. A. Leistner, W. Marais or J. Wiss. His main collecting areas were Pretoria and northwards to Messina, Kruger National Park, Namibia, Northern Cape, Okavango, Kaokoveld, Botswana, Matopos, Caprivi Strip.

Bernard de Winter together with his wife Mayda, and botanist D. J. B. Killick, were responsible for the publishing of "Sixty-six Transvaal Trees" in 1966 on the occasion of South Africa's Republic Festival.
