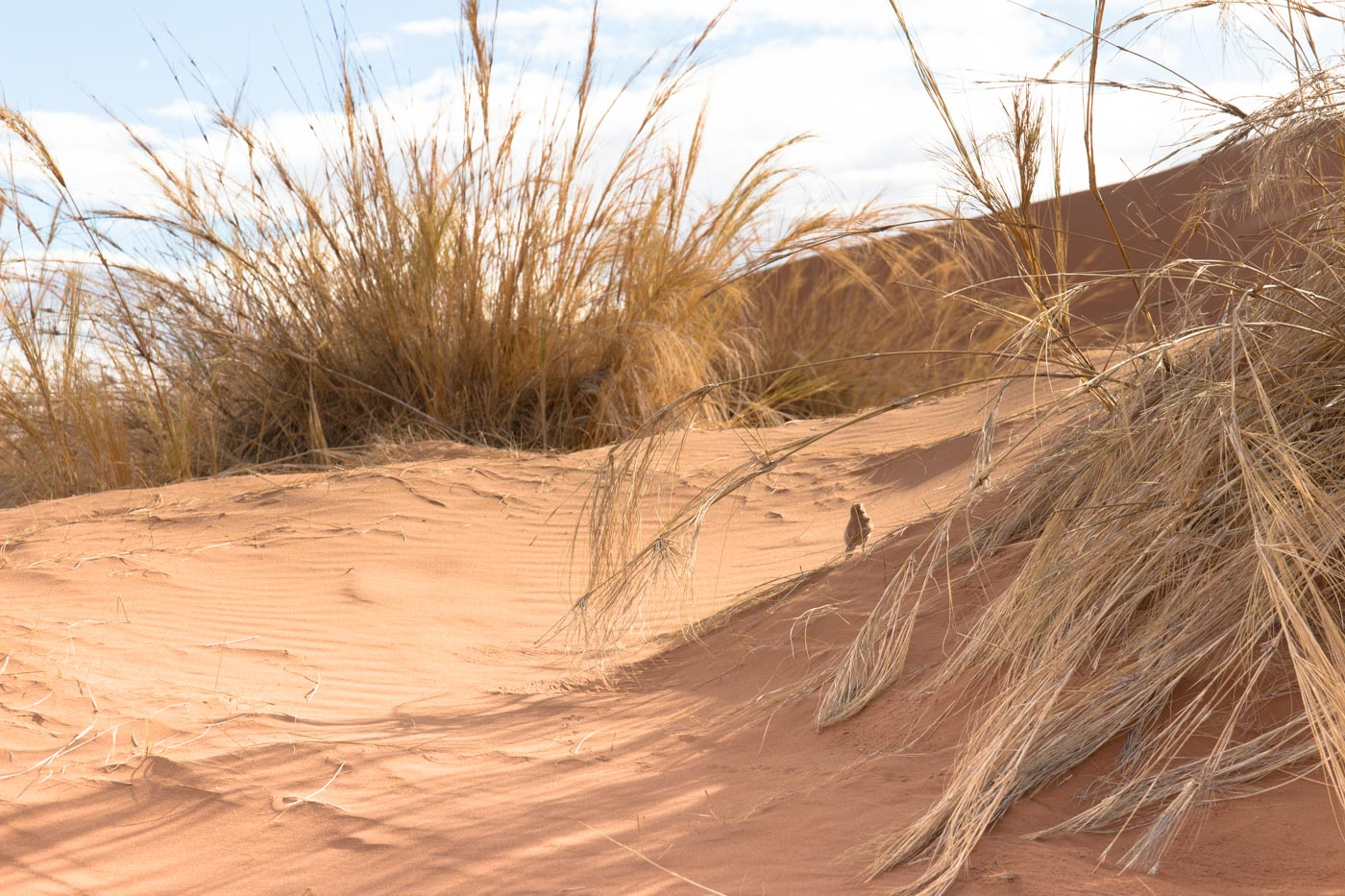

Scientific classification
- Kingdom: Plantae
- Clade: Tracheophytes
- Clade: Angiosperms
- Clade: Monocots
- Clade: Commelinids
- Order: Poales
- Family: Poaceae
- Genus: Stipagrostis
- Species: S. sabulicola

Binomial name
- Stipagrostis sabulicola (Pilg.) De Winter
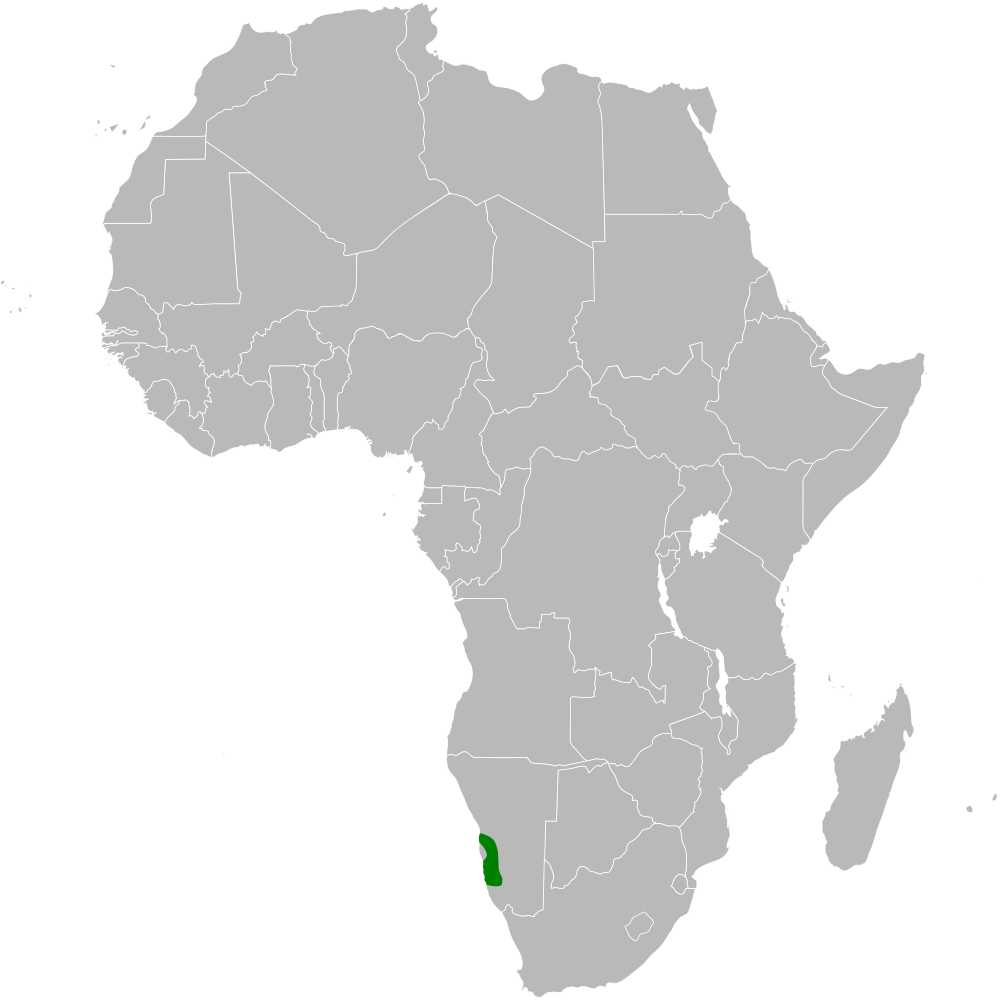
- approximate range

= Stipagrostis sabulicola =

Species of grass endemic to Namibia

Stipagrostis sabulicola, the Namib dune bushman grass, is a species of grass endemic to the dunes of the Namib desert. The perennial grass grows up to 200 cm tall and has a wide system of shallow roots, allowing it to catch water in the form of fog and dew, additional to rain.
