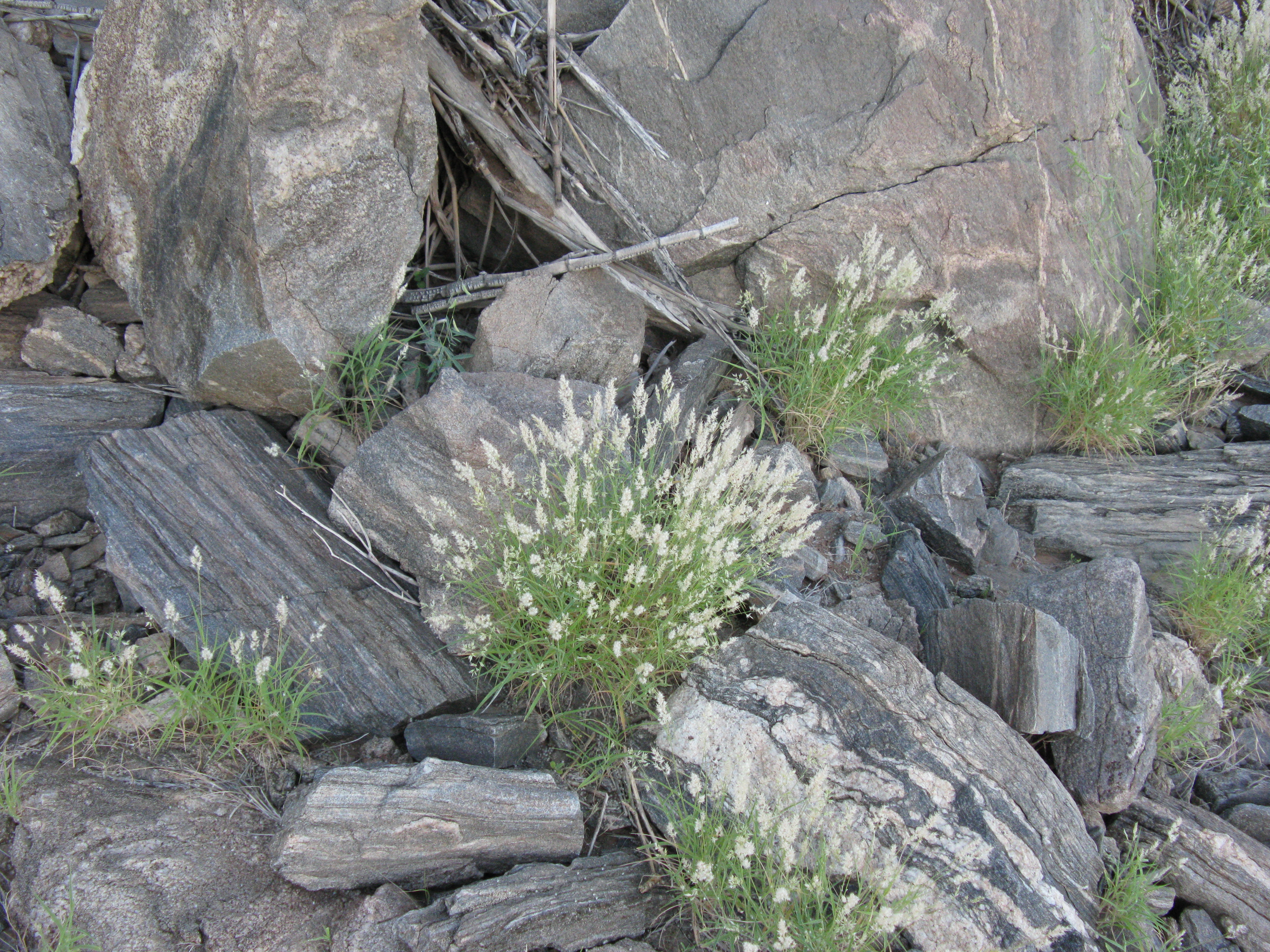
- Stipagrostis obtusa

Scientific classification
- Kingdom: Plantae
- Clade: Tracheophytes
- Clade: Angiosperms
- Clade: Monocots
- Clade: Commelinids
- Order: Poales
- Family: Poaceae
- Subfamily: Aristidoideae
- Tribe: Aristideae
- Genus: Stipagrostis; Nees

Type species
- Stipagrostis capensis (syn of S. obtusa) Nees

Synonyms
- Schistachne Fig. & De Not.

= Stipagrostis =

Genus of grasses

Stipagrostis is a genus of African, Asian, and Russian plants in the grass family.

Species

- Stipagrostis acutiflora
- Stipagrostis amabilis
- Stipagrostis anomala
- Stipagrostis arachnoidea
- Stipagrostis brachyathera
- Stipagrostis brevifolia
- Stipagrostis ciliata
- Stipagrostis damarensis
- Stipagrostis dhofariensis
- Stipagrostis dinteri
- Stipagrostis drarii
- Stipagrostis dregeana
- Stipagrostis fastigiata
- Stipagrostis foexiana
- Stipagrostis garubensis
- Stipagrostis geminifolia
- Stipagrostis giessii
- Stipagrostis gonatostachys
- Stipagrostis grandiglumis
- Stipagrostis griffithii
- Stipagrostis hermannii
- Stipagrostis hirtigluma
- Stipagrostis hochstetteriana
- Stipagrostis karelinii
- Stipagrostis lanata
- Stipagrostis lanipes
- Stipagrostis libyca
- Stipagrostis lutescens
- Stipagrostis masirahensis
- Stipagrostis multinerva
- Stipagrostis namaquensis
- Stipagrostis namibensis
- Stipagrostis obtusa
- Stipagrostis paradisea
- Stipagrostis pellytronis
- Stipagrostis pennata
- Stipagrostis plumosa
- Stipagrostis prodigiosa
- Stipagrostis proxima
- Stipagrostis pungens
- Stipagrostis raddiana
- Stipagrostis ramulosa
- Stipagrostis rigidifolia
- Stipagrostis sabulicola
- Stipagrostis sahelica
- Stipagrostis schaeferi
- Stipagrostis scoparia
- Stipagrostis seelyae
- Stipagrostis shawii
- Stipagrostis sokotrana
- Stipagrostis subacaulis
- Stipagrostis uniplumis
- Stipagrostis vexillifeta
- Stipagrostis vulnerans
- Stipagrostis xylosa
- Stipagrostis zeyheri
