= Edmond van Eetvelde =

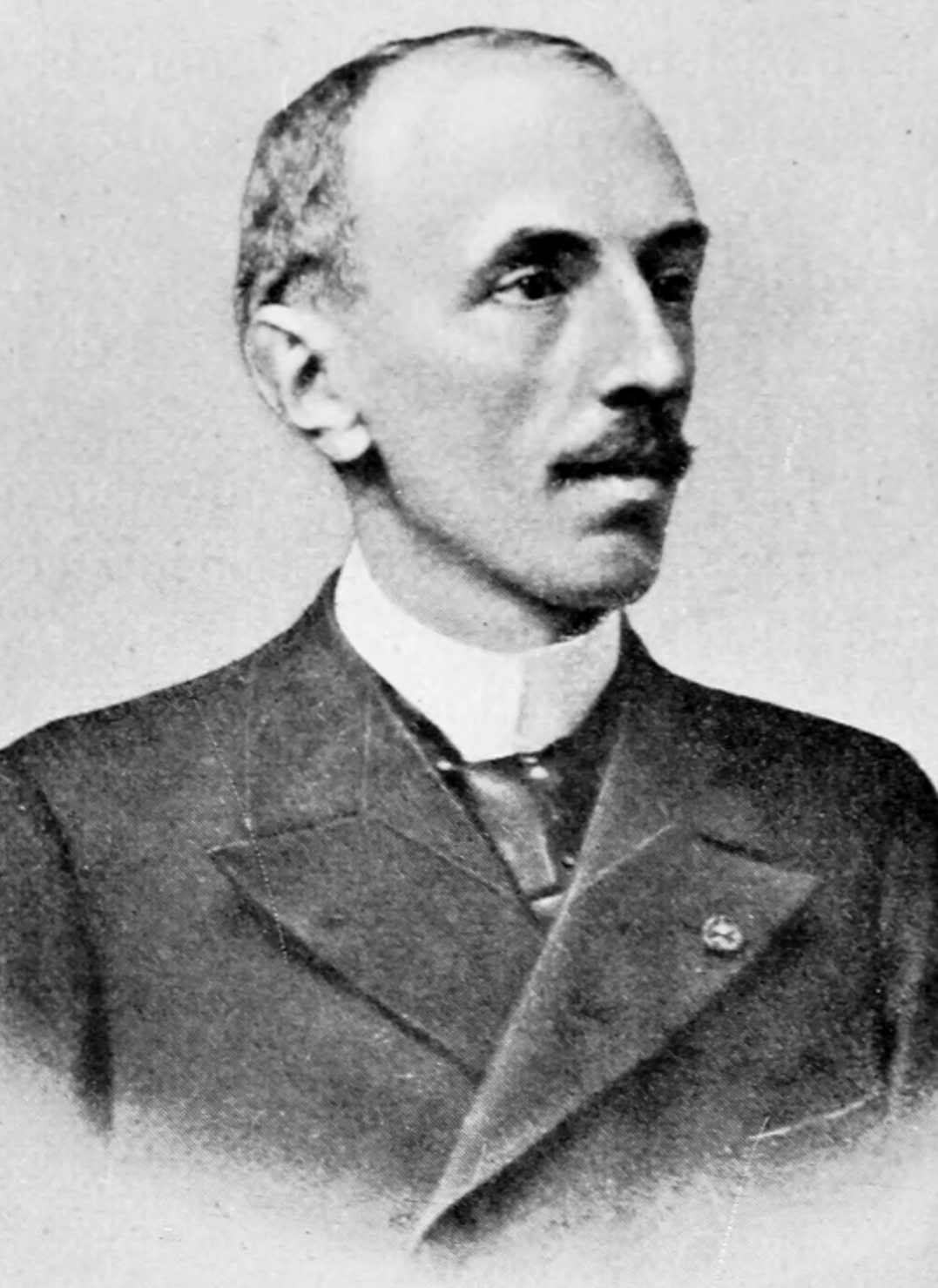
- Van Eetvelde from J. Boillot-Robert's Lépold II et le Congo (1900)
- Born: Stanislas Marie Léon Edmond van Eetvelde; 21 April 1852; Postel, Mol, Belgium
- Died: 8 December 1925 (aged 73); Brussels, Belgium
- Occupations: Diplomat, politician
- Known for: General Administrator of the Department of Foreign Affairs of the Independent State of the Congo.

Edmond van Eetvelde ( 21 April 1852 – 8 December 1925) was a Belgian diplomat and first General Administrator of the Department of Foreign Affairs of the Independent State of the Congo. He is also famous for commissioning the Belgian Art Nouveau architect Victor Horta in 1898 to build the Hôtel van Eetvelde, his private residence in Brussels.

== Early years ==
Edmond van Eetvelde was born on 21 April 1852 in Postel, Mol in northeast Belgium. He came from a French-speaking family in Aalst, but his parents came from the Mol region. He studied at the Athénée of Liège then took courses at the Higher Institute of Commerce in Antwerp, where he graduated in 1871 with great distinction. This earned him a scholarship which enabled him to go to China to study the possibilities of trading there.

== China and India ==
He arrived in Shanghai in 1872. He quickly wrote a report while there laying out the opportunities for Belgium to build railways in China. He worked on site for the customs service in Beijing and then in Canton (Guangzhou). Six years after his departure, he returned to Belgium where he submitted a detailed report of his activities. During this stay he learned much about the CICM Missionaries, who were very active in China, and he later supported this congregation in its missions in Congo. He was then sent as consul general to Calcutta. He returned from India after six months because of health problems.

== Independent State of the Congo ==
In 1885 van Eetvelde was appointed general administrator of foreign affairs of the Independent State of the Congo, based on the recommendation of the King's minister Joseph de Riquet de Caraman-Chimay. Although Auguste, Baron Lambermont, was the principal adviser to the king, van Eetvelde exercised important powers not only in foreign affairs but also in matters of justice and worship. He participated in the Royal Council, an informal body that administered the Congo Free State until 1890.

From May 1885, Leopold II considered that the facade constituted by the International Association of the Congo was no longer necessary after the Berlin Conference of 1884–1885. He appointed three general administrators, one of whom, Edmond van Eetvelde, was in charge of Foreign Affairs. The first two, Maximilien Strauch in charge of internal affairs and Hubert Van Neuss in charge of finances, resigned in 1890 to protest against the king's orders which created a de facto state monopoly on the two main Congolese products: ivory and rubber. Edmond van Eetvelde remained in place and took on the functions of the other two.

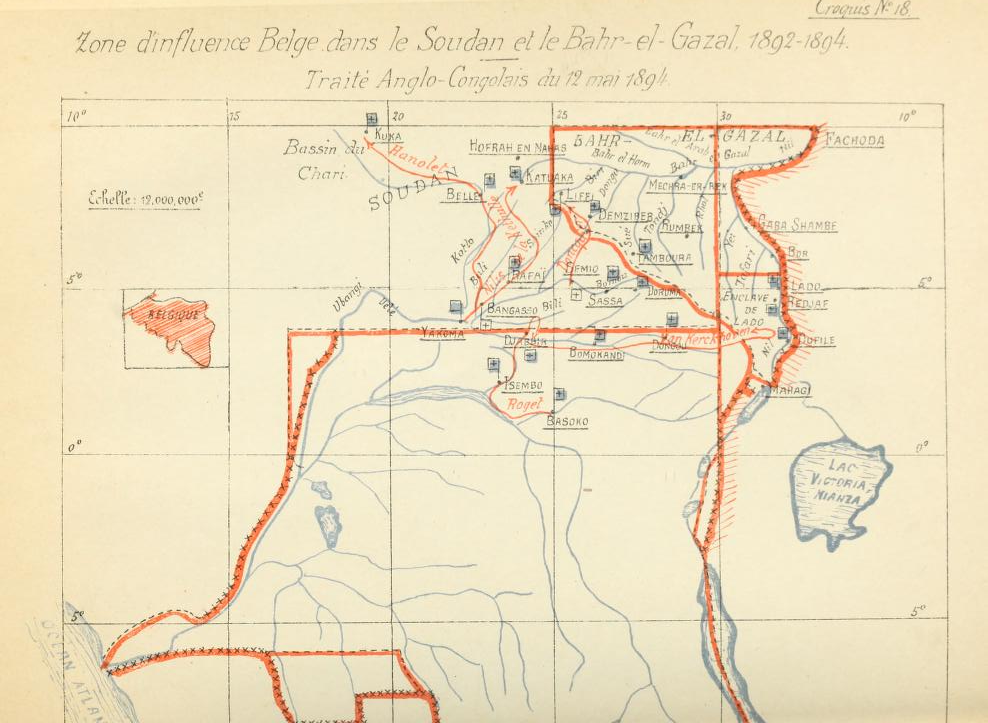
Map showing changes to the Congo Free State boundaries

In 1887 van Eetvelde intervened in the delicate negotiations between France and the Congo Free State to fix its northern and western borders. This became possible after the expedition of the Belgian explorer Alphonse Van Gele to the sources of the Ubangi River. The negotiations led to an agreement in 1887 between France and King Leopold II, on a boundary to the north along the Mbomou River and on the east along the Ubangi River instead of following the 17°E meridian and 4°N latitude.

In 1888 van Eetvelde defended the interests of the Congo Free State in front of José Vicente Barbosa du Bocage, the Minister of Foreign Affairs of Portugal who claimed the territories of the former Kingdom of Lunda for the colony of Angola. The Portuguese eventually accepted the Kwango River as a boundary above 8°S latitude, from which point the boundary runs east to the Kasai River.

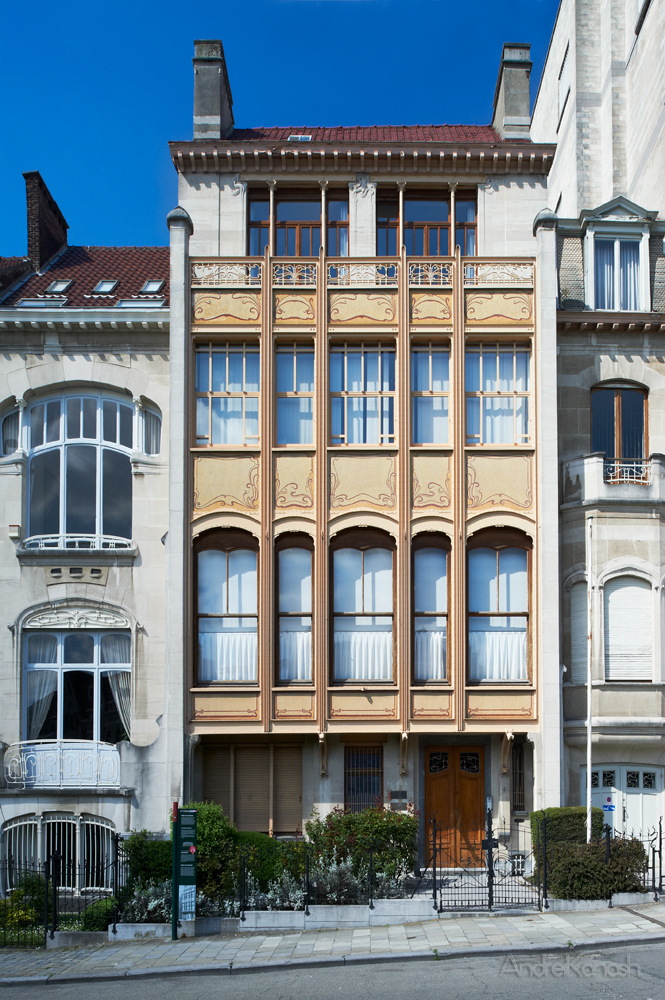
The Art Nouveau Hôtel van Eetvelde (1898) in Brussels

In 1893 van Eetvelde was directly involved in the negotiations between the English emissaries and the Congo Free State. The Free State had gained a foothold with a few troops in the valley of the Upper Nile in Bahr el-Ghazal. The English were mainly concerned that the French were also interested in this region because of its proximity to the Nile basin. It was better that King Leopold II be on their side. An agreement was signed with the British who ceded to Leopold II, for the duration of his reign, territories located between 30 ° east longitude and the bank of the Nile up to Fashoda as well as those located between 30 ° and 25 ° east longitude. Émile Francqui also helped the king obtain this lease with England, which was acting as guardian of Egypt, on 12 May 1894 In exchange, he ceded a strip of territory from Lake Albert to Lake Tanganyika. This agreement was later questioned and only the Lado Enclave remained, until 1910.

The Belgian government asked van Eetvelde for precise information on the financial situation of the Congo Free State. He provided the information and tried to convince them that it would be profitable for Belgium to annex the state, which the king wanted. Negotiations on this subject began in 1894 were not resolved until 1908 following many reversals and much procrastination by the Belgian government.

In 1897 van Eetvelde made every effort to make a success of the colonial exhibition in Tervuren at the Royal Museum for Central Africa. This earned him the title of hereditary baron transmissible by primogeniture. In July 1898 he was the victim of a nervous illness which finally led him to resign in October 1900. He was appointed Minister of State for the Independent State of Congo in February 1901.

== Last years ==
From 1906 van Eetvelde devoted himself to his career in the business world. He was president and director of many Belgian financial companies such as the Compagnie du chemin de fer du Congo supérieur aux Grands Lacs africains and the Banque de Bruxelles. Edmond van Eetvelde died in Brussels on 8 December 1925 and was buried in Mol.

== Sources ==
- "Archief van Eetvelde, Edmond. 1869-1954", Archiefbank Vlaanderen (in Dutch), 2019
- Bulletin officiel de l'État indépendant du Congo, no 2 (in French), 1885
- Emerson, Barbara (1980), Léopold II, le royaume et l'empire (in French), translated by Hervé Douxchamps; Gérard Colson, Paris-Gembloux: Duculot, ISBN 2801108049
- "Fonds Van Eetvelde, Edmond", Fonds d'archives du Musée royal de l'Afrique centrale (in French)
- Lichtervelde, L de (1932), Léopold II (in French), Louvain: édition Rex, p. 400
