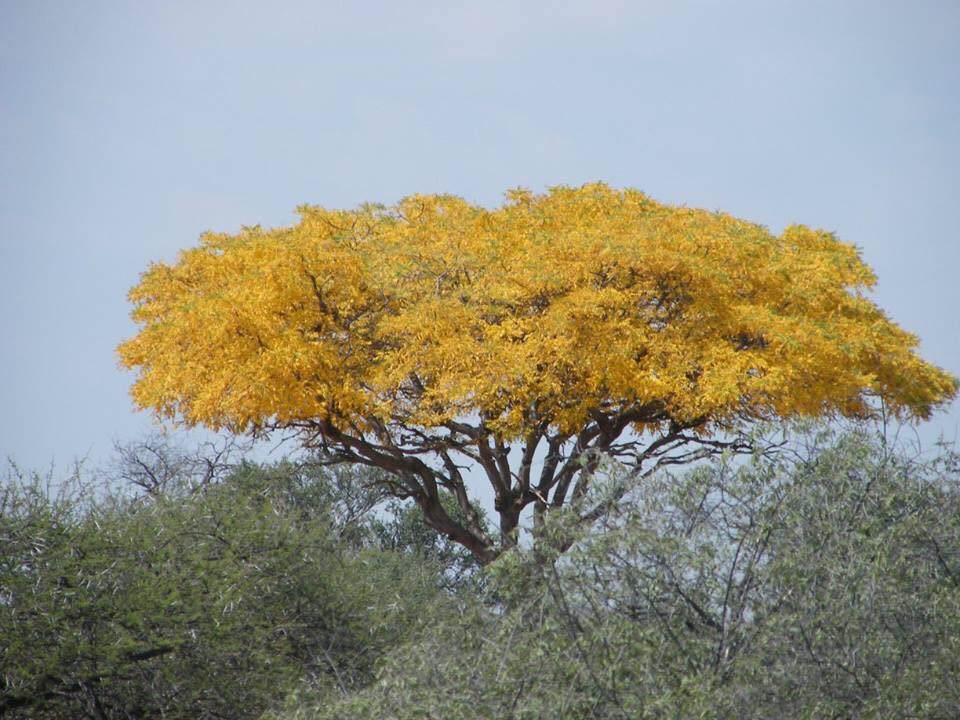
- Kirkia acuminata

Scientific classification
- Kingdom: Plantae
- Clade: Tracheophytes
- Clade: Angiosperms
- Clade: Eudicots
- Clade: Rosids
- Order: Sapindales
- Family: Kirkiaceae
- Genus: Kirkia; Oliv., 1868

= Kirkia =

Genus of flowering plants

Kirkia is a genus of plant in family Kirkiaceae. It was previously placed in family Simaroubaceae, but was transferred into Kirkiaceae, together with Pleiokirkia, because these genera produce neither quassinoids nor limonoids.

The genus name of Kirkia is in honour of Sir John Kirk, GCMG, KCB, FRS (1832–1922), who was a physician, naturalist, companion to explorer David Livingstone, and British administrator in Zanzibar.

== Species ==
It contains the following species (6), but this list may be incomplete):

- Kirkia acuminata Oliv., 1868, South Africa (Transvaal), Namibia, Botswana, SW-Angola, SE-D.R. Congo (Zaire), Malawi, Zambia, Zimbabwe, Mozambique
- Kirkia burgeri B. Stannard Ethiopia; Somalia
- Kirkia dewinteri Merxm. & Heine, 1960 Namibia
- Kirkia leandrii (Capuron) Stannard, 2007 Madagascar; syn.: Pleiokirkia leandrii Capuron, 1961
- Kirkia tenuifolia Engl., 1902 SE-Ethiopia, Somalia, Djibouti, Kenya
- Kirkia wilmsii Engl., South Africa (Transvaal)

== Journal ==
'Kirkia' is also the name of 'The Zimbabwe Journal of Botany', published by the National Herbarium and Botanic Garden, Zimbabwe. Since 1960 to the present day and written in English.
