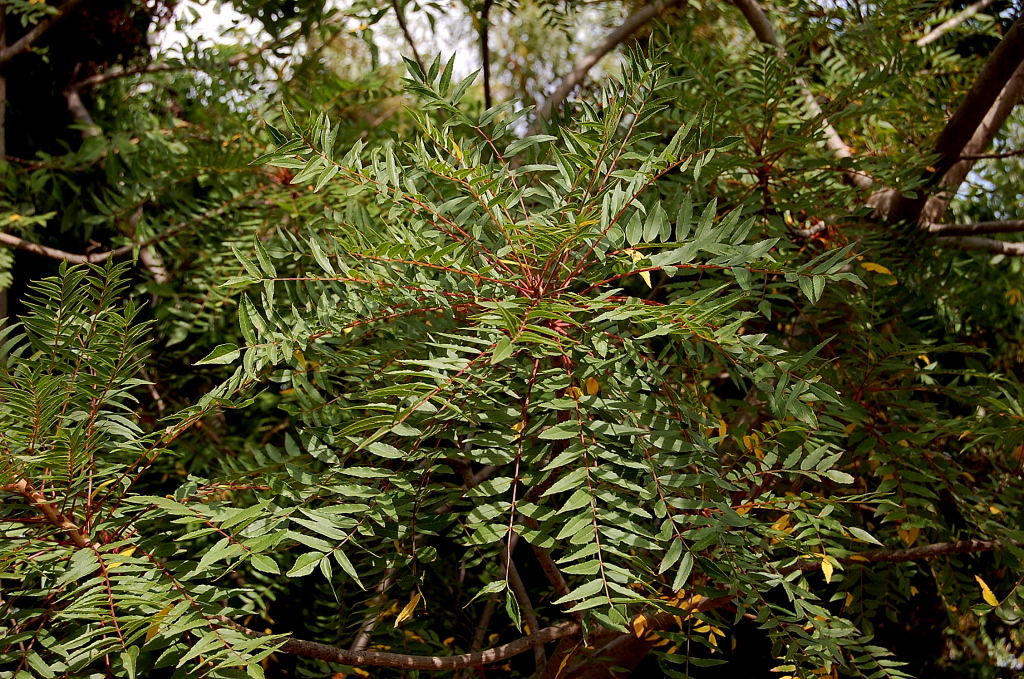
- Kirkia wilmsii

Scientific classification
- Kingdom: Plantae
- Clade: Tracheophytes
- Clade: Angiosperms
- Clade: Eudicots
- Clade: Rosids
- Order: Sapindales
- Family: Kirkiaceae; Takht.

Genera
- Kirkia; Pleiokirkia

= Kirkiaceae =

Family of flowering plants

Kirkiaceae is a family of flowering plants in the order Sapindales. It comprises one (or two) genera, Kirkia (and Pleiokirkia now included in Kirkia), totalling six species. These two genera were previously placed in family Simaroubaceae, but were transferred into their own family because they produce neither quassinoids nor limonoids. Kirkia is named for Captain John Kirk (explorer) of the famous Zambesi Expedition.

They occur along the east coast of Africa, and in Madagascar.
