= Auguste, Baron Lambermont =

Belgian statesman

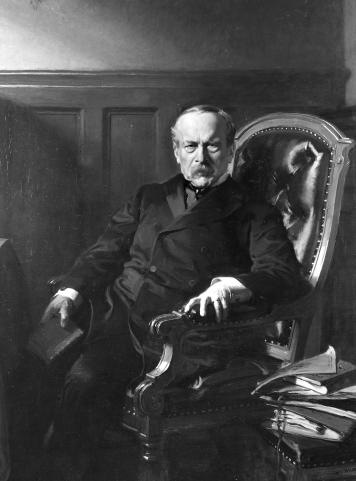
- Auguste Lambermont
- Born: 25 March 1819; Dion-le-Val, Brabant
- Died: 7 March 1905 (aged 85)
- Occupation: politician

François Auguste, Baron Lambermont (25 March 1819 in Dion-le-Val, Brabant – 7 March 1905), was a Belgian statesman. He came of a family of small farmer proprietors, who had held land during three centuries. He was intended for the priesthood and entered the seminary of Floreffe, but his energies claimed a more active sphere.

He left the monastery for the University of Louvain. Here he studied law, and also prepared himself for the military examinations. At that juncture the first Carlist War broke out, and Lambermont hastened to the scene of action to support catholicism and absolutism. His services were accepted (April 1838) and he was entrusted with the command of two small cannon. He also acted as aide-de-camp to Colonel Durando. He greatly distinguished himself, and for his intrepidity on one occasion he was decorated with the Cross of the highest military Royal Military Order of Saint Ferdinand.

Returning to Belgium he entered the Ministry for Foreign Affairs in 1842. He served in this department sixty-three years. He was closely associated with several of the most important questions in Belgian history during the last half of the 19th century, notably the freeing of the Scheldt. He was one of the first Belgians to see the importance of developing the trade of their country, and at his own request he was attached to the commercial branch of the foreign office. The tolls imposed by the Dutch on navigation on the Scheldt strangled Belgian trade, for Antwerp was the only port of the country. The Dutch had the right to make this levy under treaties going back to the Treaty of Münster in 1648, and they clung to it still more tenaciously after Belgium separated herself in 1830-1831 from the united kingdom of the Netherlands, the London Conference in 1839 fixing the toll payable to Holland at 1.5 florins (3s.) per ton.

From 1856 to 1863 Lambermont devoted most of his energies to the removal of this impediment. In 1856 he drew up a plan of action, and he prosecuted it with untiring perseverance until he saw it embodied in an international convention seven years later. Twenty-one powers and states attended a conference held on the question at Brussels in 1863, and on 15 July the treaty freeing the Scheldt was signed. For this achievement Lambermont was made a baron. Among other important conferences in which Lambermont took a leading part were those of Brussels (1874) on the usages of war, Berlin (1884–1885) on Africa and the Congo region, and Brussels (1890) of Central African affairs and the slave trade. He was joint reporter with Baron Alphonse Chodron de Courcel of the Berlin Conference in 1884-1885, and on several occasions he was chosen as arbitrator by one or other of the great European powers. But his great achievement was the freeing of the Scheldt and in token of its gratitude the city of Antwerp erected a fine monument to his memory.

== Honours ==
- Grand Officer in the Order of Leopold.
- Knight Grand Cross in the Order of Saint Stanislaus.
- Knight Grand Cross in the Order of Franz Joseph.
- Knight Grand Cross in the Order of the Oak Crown.
- Knight Grand Cross in the Order of the Lion and the Sun.
- Knight Grand Cross in the Order of Albert the Bear.
- Grand Officer in the Legion of Honour.
- Grand Officer in the Order of the Redeemer.
- Commander in the Order of the Iron Crown
- Knight, 1st class in the Order of Saint Fernando.
