= Brussels Conference Act of 1890 =

International anti-slavery agreement

Brussels Conference Act, 1890
Convention Relative to the Slave Trade and Importation into Africa of Firearms, Ammunition, and Spiritous Liquors
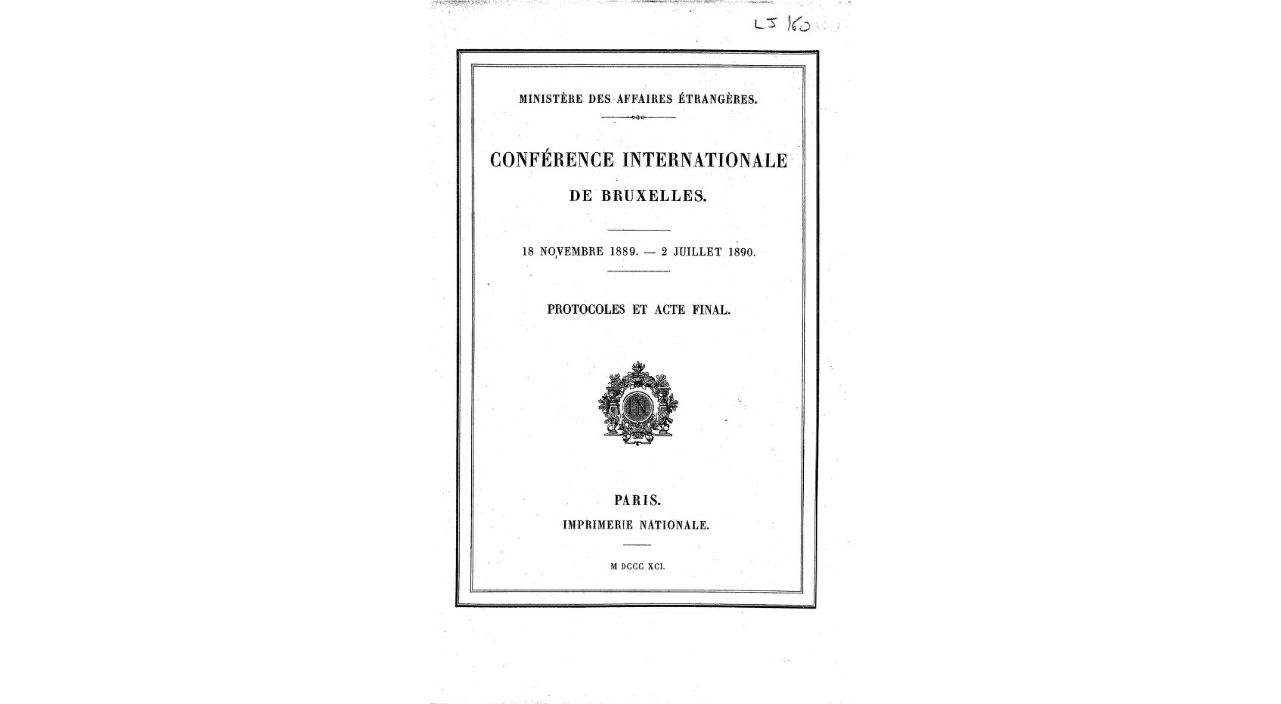
- Type: Anti-slavery; drug control
- Drafted: 1889–1890
- Signed: 2 July 1890
- Location: Brussels
- Effective: 31 August 1891
- Negotiators: Austria-Hungary; Belgium; Congo Free State; Denmark; Abyssinia; France; Germany; Italy; Netherlands; Ottoman Empire; Qajar Iran; Portugal; Russia; Spain; Sultanate of Zanzibar; Sweden–Norway; United Kingdom; United States

The Brussels Conference Act of 1890 (officially, the Convention Relative to the Slave Trade and Importation into Africa of Firearms, Ammunition, and Spiritous Liquors) was a collection of anti-slavery measures signed in Brussels on 2 July 1890 (and which entered into force on 31 August 1891) to, as the act itself puts it, "put an end to Negro Slave Trade by land as well as by sea, and to improve the moral and material conditions of existence of the native races".

== Context ==
The negotiations for this act arose out of the Brussels Anti-Slavery Conference 1889–90. The act was specifically applicable to those countries "who have possessions or Protectorates in the conventional basin of the Congo", to the Ottoman Empire and other powers or parts who were involved in slave trade in East African coast, Indian Ocean and other areas.

The parties to the agreement were Austria-Hungarian Empire, Belgium, the Congo Free State, Denmark, Ethiopia, France, the German Empire, Italy, the Netherlands, the Ottoman Empire, Persia, Portugal, Russian Empire, Spain, Sultanate of Zanzibar, Sweden–Norway, the United Kingdom, and the United States.

The Brussels Act was supplemented and revised by the Convention of Saint-Germain-en-Laye 1919 signed by the Allied Powers of the First World War on 10 September 1919.

== Legal provisions ==
=== Trade in human beings ===
Article 21 of the Act describes the zone in which measures should be taken, referring to "the coasts of Indian Ocean (including the Persian Gulf and the Red Sea), the Belouchistan up to Tangalane (Quilimane)... " and Madagascar. The Act provided for the establishment of a relevant International Bureau in Zanzibar.

In its Article 68, the Act established the following:

"the Powers recognize the high value of the Law on the prohibition of Slave Trafficking of blacks, issued by His Majesty The Emperor of the Ottomans on 4–16 Dec. 1889, and are assured that a surveillance action will be taken by the Ottoman authorities, especially in the western part of Arabia and on the routes that keep that coast in communication with other possessions of His Imperial Majesty in Asia."

Similar actions were called on to be taken by the Shah of Persia and the Sultan of Zanzibar (Art. 69, 70). The participants also agreed to stop sales of guns and other weapons to Africans.

=== Drug control measures for liquor ===
Because of its provisions on alcohol, the Act is considered the first treaties on the control of psychoactive substances (preceding the first opium treaty from 1909).

== See also ==
- 1926 Slavery Convention
- Supplementary Convention on the Abolition of Slavery
- Slave Trade Acts
- International drug control conventions
