= Convention of Saint-Germain-en-Laye 1919 =

Anti-slavery treaty

Convention of Saint-Germain-en-Laye 1919, was an international anti-slavery convention signed in Saint-Germain-en-Laye in 1919.

The convention revised the preceding Brussels Conference Act of 1890. It was introduced in connection to the Treaty of Saint-Germain.

The preceding anti-slavery treaty of 1890 was in need of a revision. The convention confirmed the European powers position against slavery and slave trade, and the signatur countries agreed to act for the total abolition of all forms of slavery, forced labor, pseudo-adoption, forced concubinage, debt slavery and all forms of slave trade.

It was followed seven years later by the 1926 Slavery Convention.
