= Battle of Dufile =

Coordinates: 3°33′59.9184″N 31°56′0.0024″E

- Part of the Mahdist War
Date	28 November 1888
Location	Dufile, Uganda
Result	Egyptian victory

Belligerents
Egypt	Mahdist State

Commanders and leaders
Selim Bey	Umar Sālih

Strength
1,200	1,400

Casualties and losses
Unknown	210–250 killed

The Battle of Dufile was fought at the fort of Dufile, Uganda on 28 November 1888 between Mahdist forces and a garrison loyal to the Khedive of Egypt. This followed a three-day siege in which the fort was penetrated and members of steamer crews were killed in the harbour. The 1,200 garrison troops were led by Selim Bey while 1,400 Mahdists were led by Umar Sālih. Between 210 and 250 Mahdists were killed and they then retreated from the area for a period.

Before the siege began, news of the approach of the Mahdists allowed the concentration of troops from other garrisons at Dufile. On November 17, Selim Bey moved women and children to safety at Wadelai along with Emin Pasha and A.J. Mounteney Jephson, who had been confined at Dufile by a mutinous garrison since August 1888. Emin's departure by steamer for Wadelai that day was saluted by the playing of the Khedivial hymn and the firing of the fort's guns to acknowledge his restoration as the Khedive's Governor of Equatoria.

The bulk of the garrison who survived the battle were taken by Frederick Lugard to Kampala Hill, after Emin had abandoned them, following the entreaties of Henry Morton Stanley. Shortly after they arrived there in December 1891, they participated in the Battle of Kampala Hill.
