= Battle of Rejaf =

1897 battle in Rejaf, South Sudan

- Part of the Mahdist War
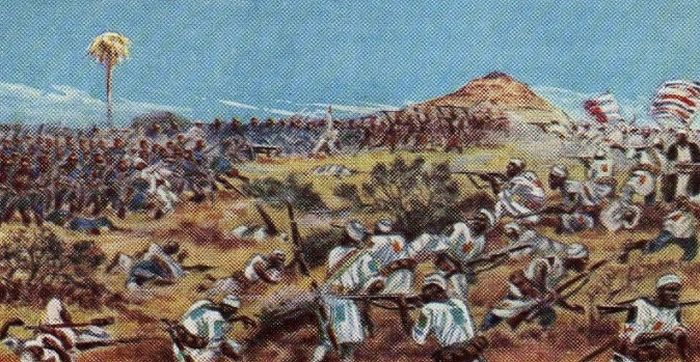
- Troops of the Congo Free State engage with the Mahdists at Rejaf along the Nile.
| Date | 17 February 1897 |
| Location | Rejaf, Lado Enclave |
| Result | Congo Free State victory |

Belligerents
| Congo Free State | Mahdist State |

Commanders and leaders
| (Congo Free State) Louis-Napoléon Chaltin | (Mahdist State) Arabi Dafalla |

Strength
| 800 Congolese regulars 500 Azande lancers | 2,000 Mahdist rebels |

Casualties and losses
| Relatively light | Several hundred killed |

The Battle of Rejaf, also known as the Battle of Bedden, was fought on 17 February 1897 between the Belgian-led forces of the Congo Free State and Mahdist rebels in Rejaf (now in present-day South Sudan). The battle resulted in a Congolese victory and the permanent expulsion of the Mahdists from the Lado Enclave, as well as the establishment of a Congolese outpost along the Nile.

King Leopold II, the Belgian king and ruler of the Congo Free State, acquired the Lado Enclave in South Sudan from Britain in 1894 as part of a territory exchange which gave the British a strip of land along the eastern Congo for Belgian access to the navigable Nile. However, the territory was overrun with Mahdists who had established their stronghold at the town of Rejaf, which occupied a valuable position for trade along the Nile river. After a wave of new funding from the Belgian government in 1895, King Leopold ordered an expedition to be led into the Lado Enclave to expel the Mahdists and fortify Rejaf as a strategic military and trading outpost.

The Congolese expedition, led by Commandant Louis-Napoléon Chaltin, reached the position after a month-long advance north-east towards the Mahdist stronghold. The rebels, numbering two thousand, had established a two-mile line across a range of hills, giving their numerically superior forces a tactical advantage over Chaltin's eight hundred men. After a failed flanking maneuver by the Mahdists, Chaltin's forces stormed the heights and dislodged the defenders. The Congolese companies pursued the retreating Mahdists back towards the town of Rejaf, where a final defense was made and similarly defeated.

The victory, achieved at relatively little cost, cleared the Lado Enclave of Mahdists and secured Rejaf as a base for future operations in the surrounding territories and along the Nile. Rejaf became the seat of government within the Lado Enclave, and remained as such when the British eventually reclaimed the territory in 1910.

== Origins ==
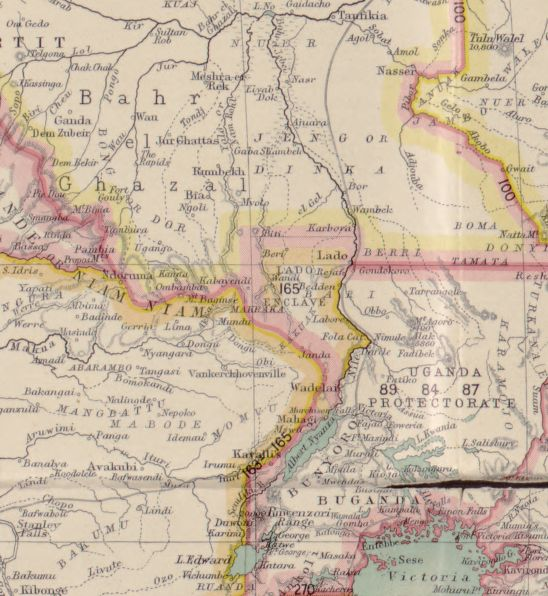
Map of the Lado Enclave with Rejaf visible along the Nile

In 1894, King Leopold II and Great Britain signed the 1894 Anglo–Congolese treaty, which resulted in the exchange of a long strip of land on the eastern side of the Congo for the Lado Enclave, leased to Leopold II for the duration of his reign. This aided the British in pursuing the Cape to Cairo railway, as well as preventing the French from achieving an east-west line by putting the Belgians in their path. With the Lado Enclave, King Leopold gained direct access to Rejaf, the last outpost on the navigable Nile. Although the outbreak of the Mahdist War (1881–1899) had disrupted trade up and down the Nile river, Leopold hoped to gain Rejaf in preparation for its reopening once the Mahdist threat had been addressed.

Since 1888, when Mahdist rebels forced the evacuation of then governor Emin Pasha, the Lado Enclave had been occupied by rebels under the leadership of Emir Arabi Dafalla. Rejaf was their strongest fortified position in the area, and it was there Arabi Dafalla stationed his equipment and soldiers. The establishment of the Mahdist State had provided the context for European powers to commence the invasion and colonization of Sudan, in which King Leopold desperately wanted to take part in order to expand his Congolese empire. However, a direct military campaign into the area was not an option; Leopold would not have been able to get permission from either the French or the British according to the rules laid out in the 1884 Berlin Conference, especially considering both nations were looking to annex Sudan themselves. King Leopold II therefore decided to disguise his campaign into the Sudan as an expeditionary force sent to reclaim the Lado Enclave from the Mahdists, although he intended to give his commanders covert orders to continue their advance far past the boundaries of the Free State's territory, first to Fashoda and then on to Khartoum. After receiving a new loan of 6.5 million francs from the Belgian government in 1895, Leopold ordered preparations to be made for the execution of his plan.

The expedition was split into two parts. The first group, composed of around eight hundred colonial troops and led by Commandant Louis-Napoléon Chaltin, was to take the main road towards Rejaf and engage the rebels openly. The second, under Belgian war hero Baron Dhanis, was a much larger force of over three thousand men, mostly natives from the Tetela ethnic group, and was to take a treacherous path through the jungle to the north. Both expeditions left for the Lado Enclave in December 1896.

=== Batetela mutiny ===
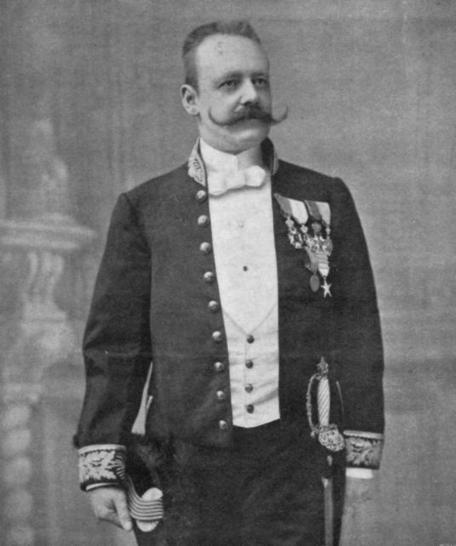
Baron Dhanis

After being underfed and forced into long, grueling marches through rough terrain for nearly two months, the Batetela in Dhanis' column mutinied against their officers in February 1897. The mutiny broke out in the advance guard, which had been pushed the hardest of those in the expedition, but soon spread to the main army, where the massively outnumbered Belgian officers were detained by their men and killed. Dhanis himself escaped the massacre by hiding in the forest, although his brother was among those killed. The now-disbanded army went on to rampage throughout the immediate area, terrorizing the northern Congo and causing great consternation among the Belgian officials whose jobs it was to keep the peace.

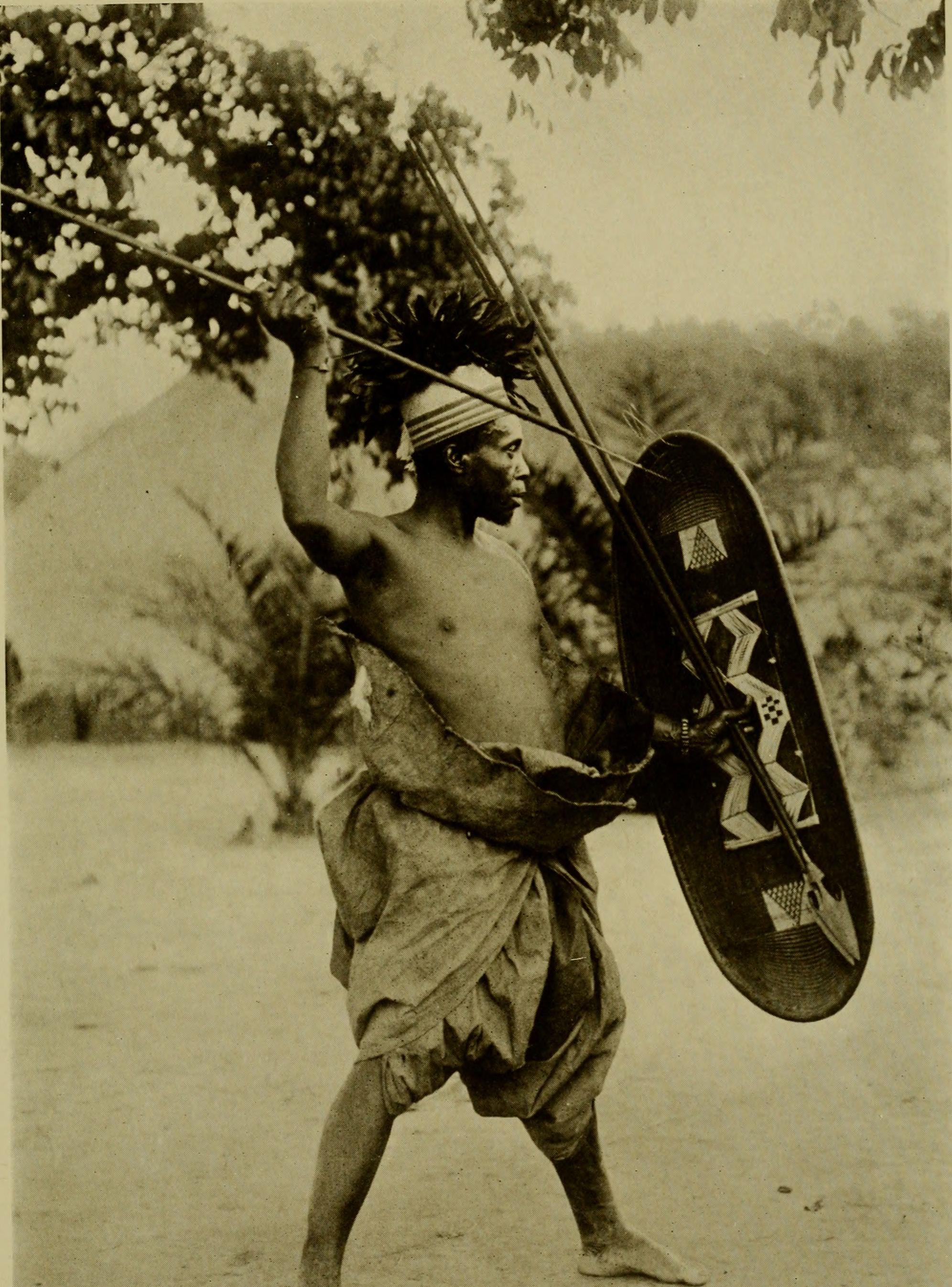
Azande Chief Bafuka

This left Chaltin's expedition as the spearhead for Leopold's northern campaign, and the commandant continued his mission despite the grave loss of Dhanis' forces. Chaltin had in his column eight companies, each containing one hundred Congolese soldiers led by a Belgian lieutenant. He was accompanied by a contingent of five hundred Azande under chiefs Renzi and Bafuka. The expedition reached the Nile on 14 February 1897, where a small party of Mahdists from Rejaf exchanged fire with Chaltin's scouts. After two days of waiting for the supply train and rear guard to arrive, a Mahdist force approached the Congolese camp in the evening of 16 February, and prepared to attack. Chaltin ordered his artillery to fire at the Mahdists, causing the assembled rebels to flee under the barrage. The next day, at six o'clock in the morning, Chaltin took to the offensive and began to advance on Rejaf.

== Battle ==
Chaltin's column advanced north with the Nile river protecting his right flank and the Azande cavalry contingent on his left. At seven o'clock, Congolese scouts sighted the two-thousand-strong Mahdist force assembled along a two-mile line that spanned a range of hills between the Nile and a parallel river. There was one clear path through the hills, which was especially well defended. Commandant Chaltin brought forward five companies for the attack, leaving his remaining three in reserve.

The Mahdists immediately opened fire upon the Free State force, who remained in cover behind a rocky outcropping some ways from the Mahdist line. For half an hour the Mahdists continued to fire at Chaltin's companies to little effect, their shots passing harmlessly above the rocks. Meanwhile, Free State soldiers moved a Krupp gun into position which, under Sergeant Cajot, fired several shells into the Mahdists' ranks.

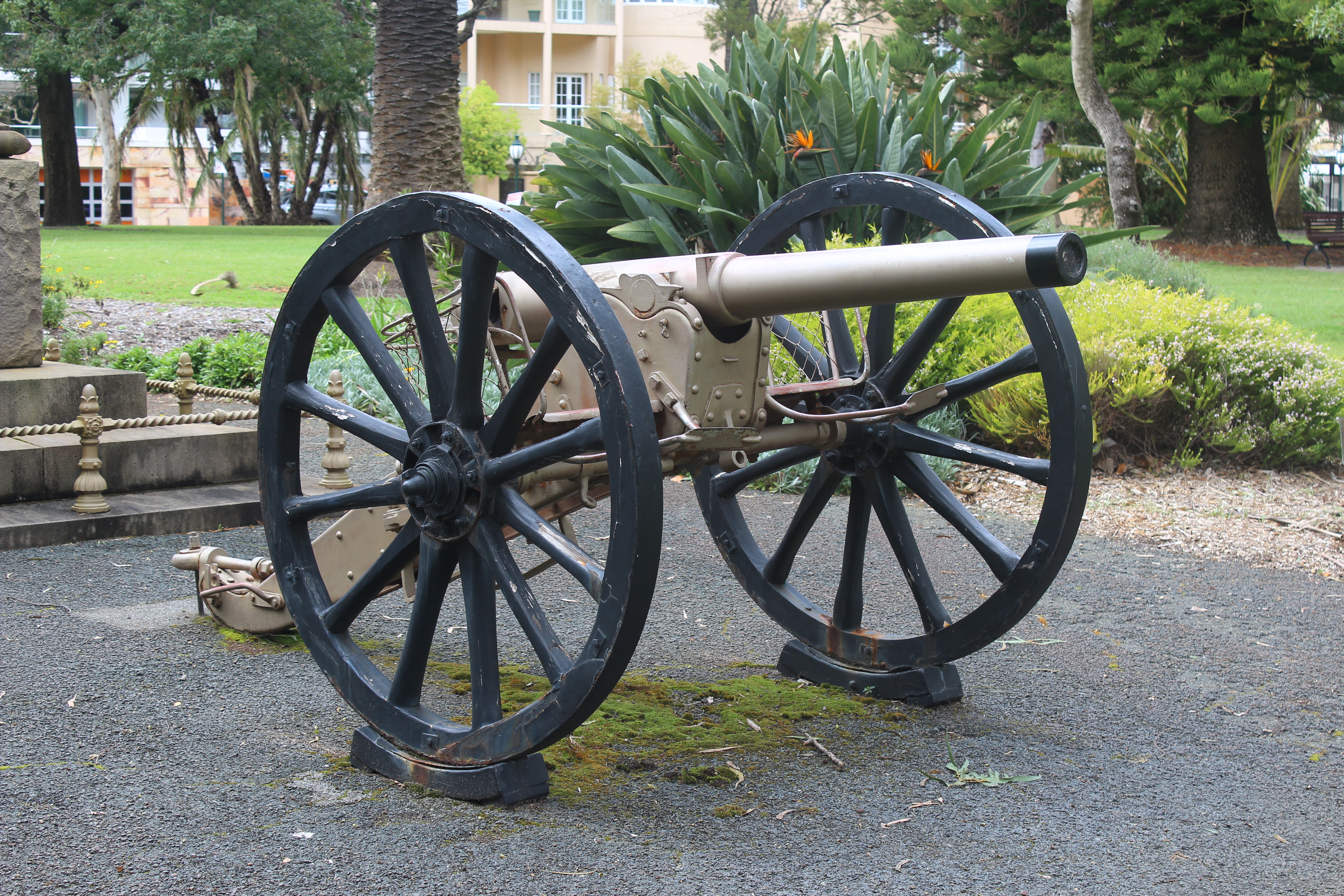
Krupp 75mm field gun

After wasting their ammunition in this preliminary action, the Mahdist force began a flanking maneuver against the Congolese. The Mahdists' right flank, situated along the river parallel to the Nile, advanced rapidly trying to pin Chaltin with his back to the river. Chaltin, who by this time had advanced within two hundred meters of the Mahdists and begun a more effective barrage of his own, replied to the threat by ordering the sudden advance of his reserve companies. The move checked the advancing Mahdists, avoiding the unfavorable position and causing the rebels to falter. Sensing that victory was near, Chaltin ordered the Azande to charge the Mahdists to separate the advanced right wing from the rest of the line. The charge was successful, and the now considerably damaged Mahdist flanking force was completely cut off and surrounded by Free State soldiers. Chaltin's main companies then attacked, pressing the Mahdist defenses as they forced their way into the hills. Three of the companies attacked the well-defended path through the hills, while two others charged the hilltops. After a fierce contest for the heights, the demoralized and weakened Mahdist line broke and its remaining defenders fled to the north towards Rejaf, leaving ammunition and weapons. The action was finished by 8:30 that morning.

The Mahdists withdrew to the fortified town of Rejaf, while Chaltin's column marched in pursuit for seventeen miles until the occupied town was sighted at about 1:30 in the afternoon. A battery of artillery pieces fired on the Congolese as they came within range, but the effect was negligible. As the Congolese approached, a hidden force of Mahdists emerged from a ravine near the bank of the Nile and attacked Chaltin's flank. The commandant realized the threat in time and repulsed the attack without much loss. Chaltin's companies then turned to begin the attack on the town. For several hours Chaltin's companies pushed through the streets and houses of Rejaf, forcing the Mahdists back until by 7:00 when they had been nearly entirely expelled. Only the citadel remained occupied, but by dawn the next morning the remaining Mahdist forces retreated, leaving behind their weapons and munitions.

== Aftermath ==
Although concrete casualty numbers are unavailable for either side, sources agree that the Congolese losses were relatively light, while several hundred Mahdist soldiers were killed in the two actions.

Commandant Chaltin recovered three cannons, over seven hundred rifles, and a considerable supply of provisions from the Mahdist post at Rejaf. Three thousand Congolese regulars were garrisoned at the town, and a gunboat was brought up the Nile to defend its ports. After securing Rejaf, Chaltin and his column marched to the northernmost point of the Lado Enclave in order to establish a Congolese presence in the area and prevent Mahdist reentry. A serious assault on the post at Rejaf occurred in June 1898, when Mahdists forced their way through Free State defenses before being finally defeated near the town.

The Emir who had commanded the Mahdist army at Rejaf, Arabi Dafalla, withdrew with what remained of his army northwest into Mahdist Sudan. He was ridiculed by his superiors for the defeat at Rejaf, and he later surrendered his army to Sultan Ali Dinar of Darfur after a failed attack on a French outpost in 1902.

As for King Leopold II's original designs for turning the expedition into a campaign into Sudan, the mutiny of Baron Dhanis' column had severely reduced the expedition's fighting power and made such a campaign impossible. Instead, Leopold's conquest of the Lado Enclave pleased the British government, at least initially, which welcomed any aid in their ongoing war with the Mahdist State. But frequent raids outside of Lado territory by Congolese forces based in Rejaf caused alarm and suspicion among British and French officials wary of Leopold's imperial ambitions. In 1910, following the death of the Belgian king in December 1909, British authorities reclaimed the Lado Enclave as per the Anglo-Congolese treaty signed in 1894, and added the territory to Anglo-Egyptian Sudan.

== Sources ==
- Charles de Kavanagh Boulger, Demetrius (1898). The Congo State: Or, The Growth of Civilisation in Central Africa. Congo: W. Thacker & Company. ISBN 0-217-57889-6.
- Richard Fox Bourne, Henry (1903). Civilisation in Congoland: A Story of International Wrong-doing. Congo: Leopold Classic Library. ISBN 978-1-110-71494-0.
- Charles de Kavanagh Boulger, Demetrius (1925). The Reign of Leopold II, King of the Belgians and Founder of the Congo State, 1865–1909. Belgium: Ardenne Publishers.
- de Schlippe, Pierre (1956). Shifting Cultivation in Africa; the Zande System of Agriculture. London: Humanities Press.
- Wellington Wack, Henry (1905). The Story of the Congo Free State. London: Nabu Press. ISBN 978-1-174-00674-6.
- Ascherson, Neal (9 September 2001). The King Incorporated: Leopold the Second and the Congo. Granta Books. ISBN 978-1-86207-290-9.
- Holland Rose, John; Percival Newton, Arthur; Alfred Benians, Ernest; Dodwell, Henry (1929). The Cambridge History of the British Empire. Commonwealth of Nations: The University Press.
- Roger Louis, William (2006). Ends of British Imperialism. I.B.Tauris. ISBN 978-1-84511-347-6.
- Leslie Hill, Richard (1967). A Biographical Dictionary of Sudan. Psychology Press. ISBN 978-0-7146-1037-5.
- Degefu, Gebre (June 2003). The Nile: Historical, Legal and Developmental Perspectives. Trafford. ISBN 978-1-4120-0056-7.
- Pakenham, Thomas (1992). The Scramble for Africa. Avon Books. ISBN 978-0-380-71999-0.
- H. Rolandsen, Øystein; W. Daly, M. (4 July 2016). A History of South Sudan. Cambridge University Press. ISBN 978-0-521-11631-2.
