= Kiro =

- Location in South Sudan
- Coordinates: 5°19′48″N 31°45′22″E
- Country: South Sudan
- Region: Equatoria
- State: Central Equatoria
- County: Terekeka County
- Time zone: UTC+3 (EAT)

Kiro was a colonial post in the Lado enclave in what is now the Central Equatoria State of South Sudan on the west side of the Bahr al Jebel or White Nile.

In 1900 there were said to be 1,500 troops from the Congo Free State divided among the three Lado enclave Nile stations of Kiro, Lado and Redjaf. After the final defeat of the Khalifa by the British under General Herbert Kitchener in 1898, the Nile up to the Uganda border became part of the Anglo-Egyptian Sudan. An expedition upriver from Ondurman arrived in December 1900. A post was established at Kiro, but later was transferred to Mongalla in April 1901 since Kiro was claimed to be in Belgian territory.

Edward Fothergill visited the Sudan around this time, basing himself at Mongalla, which lay between Lado to the south and Kiro to the north, but on the east shore of the river. By his account "Kiro, the most northern station of the Congo on the Nile, is very pretty and clean. Lado, the second station, is prettier still". However, although he said the buildings were well made, they were too closely crowded together.

James J. Harrison, writing in 1904 after his return from a shooting trip in the Congo Free State, said the west shore of the Nile between Kiro and Lado was deserted for the good reason that "nearly all the banks, lying low, are covered with marsh and sudd, harbouring millions of mosquitoes". He found the country around Kiro peaceful, with good pasturage and land for cultivation a few miles inland from the river.

The Lado enclave was transferred to the British in 1910. Later Gondokoro, Kiro, Lado and Rejaf were abandoned by the Sudan government, and no longer appear on modern maps.
