= Rejaf =

- Location in South Sudan
- Coordinates: 4°45′06″N 31°36′35″E
- Country: South Sudan
- State: Central Equatoria
- County: Juba County
- Time zone: UTC+2 (CAT)
- Climate: Aw

Rejaf, also Rajāf or Rageef, is a community in Central Equatoria in South Sudan, on the west bank of the White Nile.

The Lado Enclave was an exclave of the Congo Free State that existed from 1894 until 1910, leased by the British to King Leopold II of Belgium for the period of his lifetime. Rejaf was the terminus for boats on the Nile and the seat of the Commander, the only European colonial official within the enclave.

In the fierce Battle of Rejaf on 17 February 1897, Belgian commandant Louis-Napoléon Chaltin led a column of eight-hundred men against over two thousand Mahdists. Chaltin was victorious and the battle secured Rejaf as a Belgian post along the Nile.
