= Elizabeth Kyazike =

Ugandan archaeologist and cultural heritage researcher

Elizabeth Kyazike is a Ugandan archaeologist and cultural heritage researcher. She is an associate professor in the Department of History, Archaeology and Heritage Studies at Kyambogo University and is Dean of the Faculty of Arts and Humanities.

== Biography ==
Kyazike earned her doctorate in Archaeology and Heritage Studies from the University of Dar es Salaam in Tanzania, specializing in Archaeology. Her research has been centered mainly on the Kansyore phenomena a group of delayed return hunter-gatherers.

She is the principal investigator for a project that documents the memories of slavery and the slave trade at Fort Patiko in Uganda, which was one of the chief slave markets from which people were forcibly removed from Africa.

== Curriculum developer ==
In 2020, Kyazike was part of the group at Kyambogo University, funded by UNESCO and the Cross-Cultural Foundation of Uganda, that developed a university curriculum about African cultural heritage to be taught in several Ugandan universities. When announcing the project, Kyazike said that the researchers who wrote the three-year bachelor's program partnered with three other universities including Islamic University in Uganda, Kabale University and Uganda Martyrs University Nkozi, which will be able to launch the program. The project is designed to be available to additional universities that would like to offer the curriculum. The first students enrolled in this course in 2020. The program is designed to teach cultural heritage to students with academic backgrounds in history, performing arts, ethics, heritage economics and cultural heritage impact assessment.

At Islamic University in Uganda, students were invited to create proposals that would integrate coursework into the project about Islamic culture so that the program could help transform Muslim society.

== Selected publications ==
- Kyazike, & Mehari A. G (2022). Archaeology in and outside the Academy, Fountain Publishers, Kampala.
- Ssemulende, R., Kyazike, E., & Lejju, J. B. (2022). Recasting the Sangoan Stone Age Techno-Complex in the Stone Age Nomenclature at Sango Bay, Southern Uganda. Studies in the African Past, 15(1-34).
- Kyazike, E. (2022). “Hunter-Gatherer, Farmer Interactions in Uganda.” In Oxford Research Encyclopedia of Anthropology. Ed. Shadreck Chirikure. New York: Oxford University Press.
- Kyazike, E. (2022). Later Stone and Iron Age Cohabitation at the Nsongezi Open-Air Site, Western Uganda. Africa Review, 14(1), 1-23.
- Kyazike, Elizabeth. "The Nyero rock art site in Uganda: heritage or ritual site?" IFÈ JOURNAL OF (2019): 5.
