= Kirundu =

Kirundu may refer to:

- Kirundu, Kenya, a settlement in Kenya's Central Province
- Kirundu, Democratic Republic of the Congo, a settlement on the right bank of the Lualaba River
