= Lado, South Sudan =

Lado
- Location in South Sudan
- Coordinates: 5°2′2″N 31°41′7″E
- Country: South Sudan
- Region: Equatoria
- State: Central Equatoria
- County: Juba County
- Time zone: UTC+2 (CAT)

Lado is a small settlement in Central Equatoria, South Sudan, on the west bank of the White Nile. It is situated north of the modern-day city of Juba.

When General Gordon was appointed governor of the Egyptian territory of Equatoria in 1874, he moved his capital from Gondokoro to Lado, which had a healthier climate. In 1878 Emin Pasha was appointed Bey of Equatoria, then nominally under Egyptian control, with his base at Lado. It was the namesake and capital of the Lado Enclave. Travelling through Africa, Russian explorer Wilhelm Junker stayed in Lado in 1884, and wrote complimentarily of its brick buildings and neat streets. As of January 2026, it is listed as a ghost town on Google Maps.

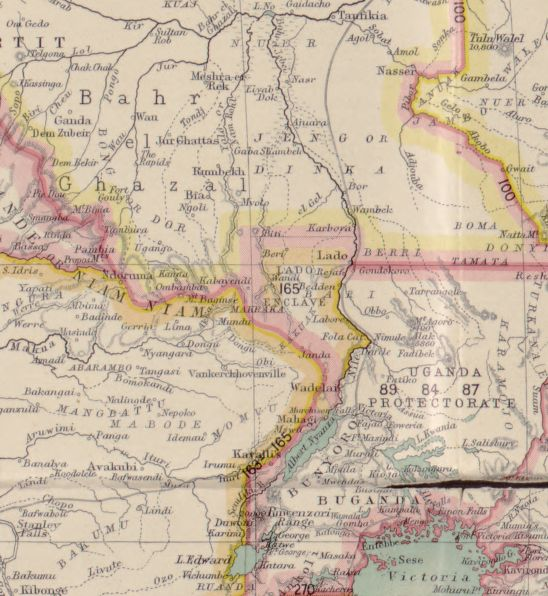
Map of the Lado Enclave showing the location of Lado on the west bank of the White Nile

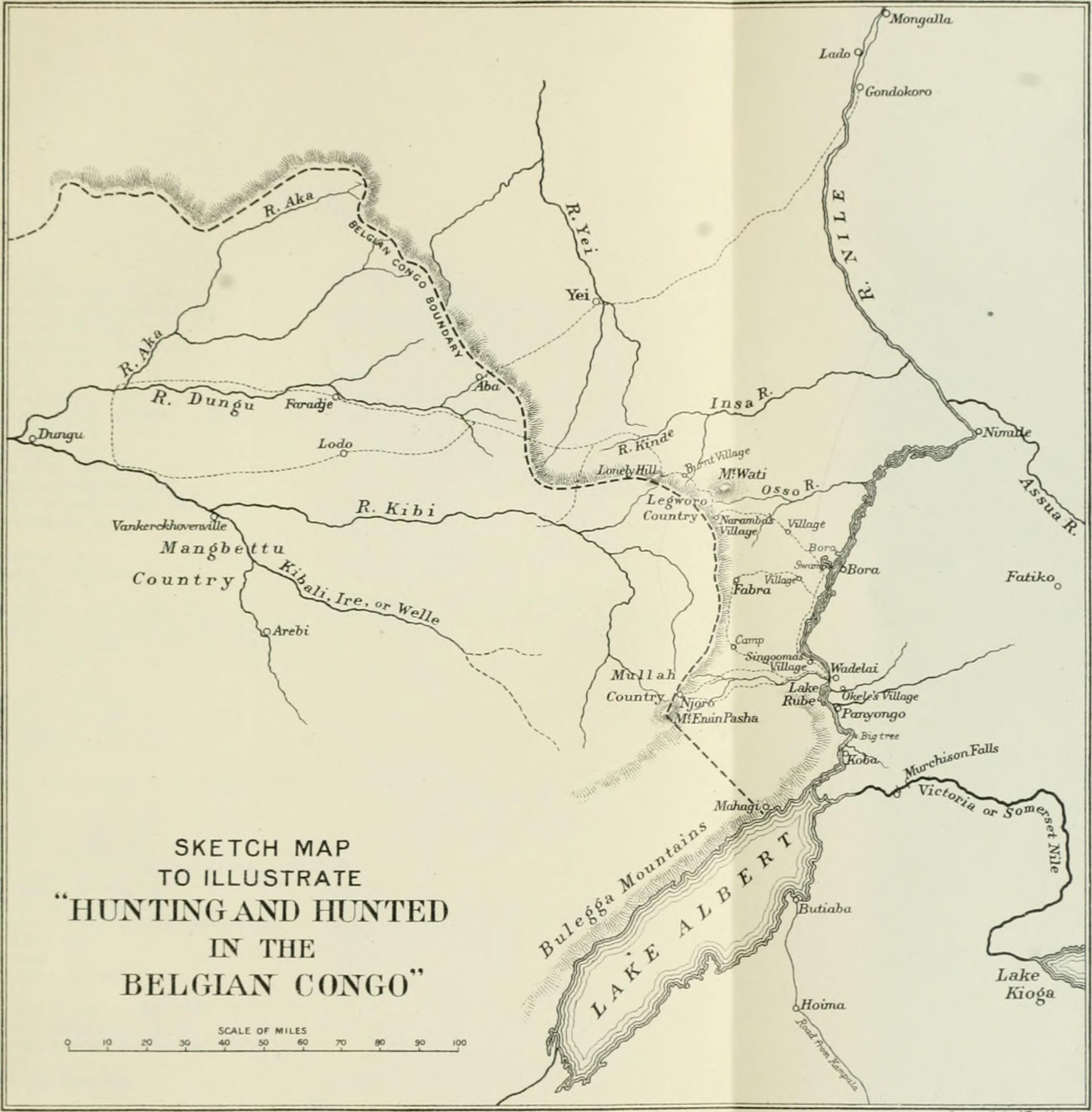
Map showing Lado halfway between Gondokoro and Mongalla

== Sources ==
- Middleton, J. (1971) "Colonial rule among the Lugbara" in Colonialism in Africa, 1870-1960, vol. 3., (ed. Turner, V.), Cambridge University Press: Cambridge. ISBN 0521-07844-X.
