= Bena-Kamba =

Bena Kamba
- Location within Democratic Republic of the Congo
- Coordinates: 2.383689°S 25.051918°E
- Country: Democratic Republic of the Congo
- Province: Maniema
- Territory: Kailo Territory

Bena Kamba is a community on the Lomami River in Maniema province of the Democratic Republic of the Congo.

The Lomami, which flows northward parallel to the Lualaba or Upper Congo River, is navigable as far south as Bena Kamba. From there, it is not far to travel by land to Riba Riba on the Lualaba, bypassing the rapids lower down. Louis Napoléon Chaltin took this route in his 1893 campaign against Arab slavers. In 1891 Alexandre Delcommune chose to travel to the Luabala via Bena-Kamba on his expedition to Katanga, although his route up the Lualaba turned out to be extremely difficult, with many rapids to be negotiated.

In January 1900 The New York Times published a report from Southern Presbyterian missionaries stationed at Luebo that said fourteen villages had been burned and ninety or more of the local people killed in the Bena Kamba country by Congo Free State troops. The raid had been undertaken by Zappo Zap warriors, who had then engaged in cannibalism. It had been ordered because the local people could not pay the excessive tribute of rubber, ivory, slaves and goats demanded by the Belgians.

The town lies on the western boundary of a proposed national park to protect endangered species such as gorillas, which as of 2003 were increasingly being hunted for bushmeat.
