= Lokandu =

- Location within Democratic Republic of the Congo
- Coordinates: 2.53161°S 25.761395°E
- Country: Democratic Republic of the Congo
- Province: Maniema
- Territory: Kailo
- National language: Swahili

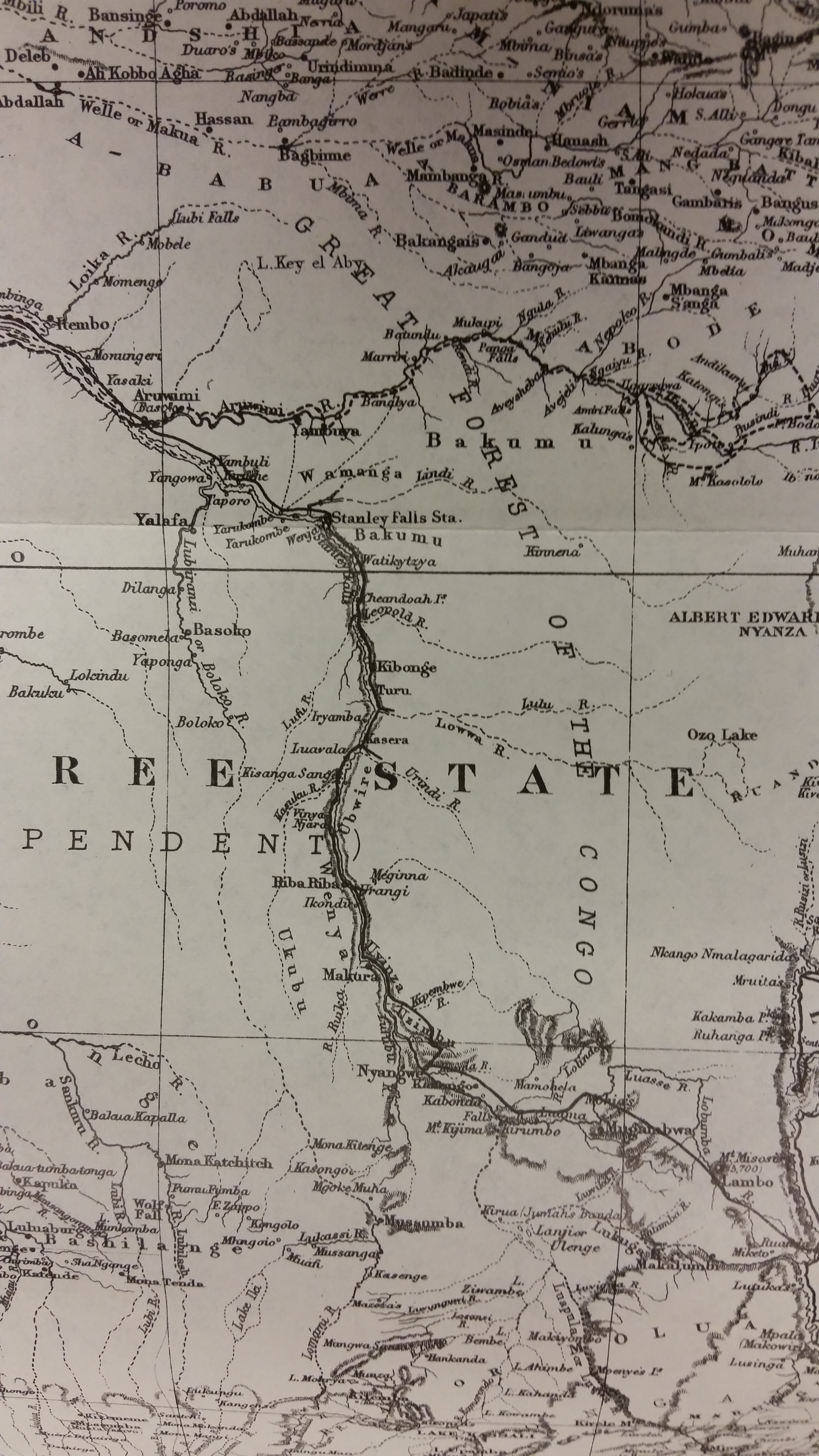
The black line indicates Stanley's route.

Lokandu is a community in Maniema Province of the Democratic Republic of the Congo, on the Lualaba River downstream from Kindu.

Henry Morton Stanley refers to it as "the frontier village of Manyema, which is called Riba-Riba."

The town was formerly called Riba Riba, when it was burned down in 1893 by a force led by Louis Napoléon Chaltin striking overland from Bena-Kamba. After being rebuilt, it took its present name.

== See also ==
- James Sligo Jameson § Slave girl slaughtered
