= Wilhelm Junker =

Russian explorer in Africa (1840–1892)

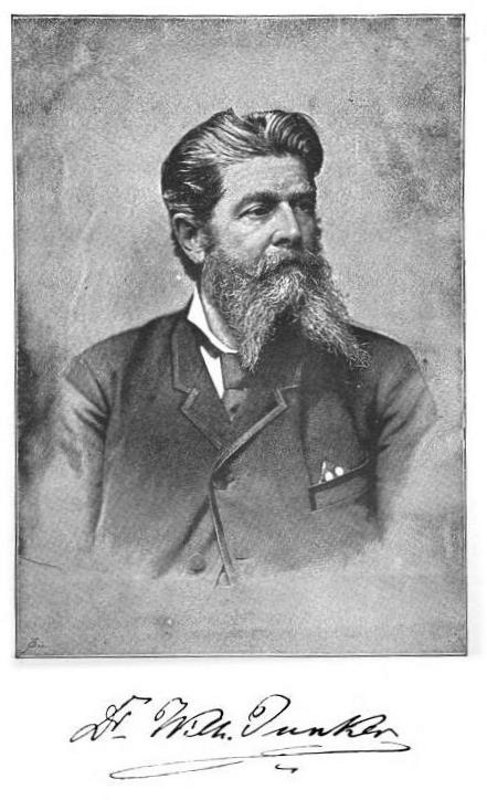
- Born: 6 April [O.S. 25 March] 1840; Moscow
- Died: February 13, 1892 (aged 51); Saint Petersburg
- Known for: Russian explorer of Africa, participant of ethnographic expeditions of the Russian Geographical Society and Emin Pasha
- Awards: Vega Medal

Wilhelm Junker (Russian: Василий Васильевич Юнкер; 6 April [O.S. 25 March] 1840 – 13 February [O.S. 1 February] 1892) was a Russian explorer of Africa. Junker was of German descent.

== Career ==
Born in Moscow, he studied medicine at the Imperial University of Dorpat, Göttingen, Berlin and Prague, but did not practise for long. After a series of short journeys to Iceland (1869), Western Africa (1873), Tunis (1874) and Lower Egypt (1875), he remained almost continuously in eastern Equatorial Africa from 1875 to 1886, making first Khartoum and afterwards Lado the base of his expeditions.

Junker was a leisurely traveller and a careful observer; his main object was to study the peoples with whom he came into contact, and to collect specimens of plants and animals, and the result of his investigations in these particulars is given in his Reisen in Afrika (3 vols., Vienna, 1889–1891), a work of high merit. An English translation by A. H. Keane, in three volumes, was published in 1890–1892.

He investigated the Nile-Congo watershed, successfully combated Georg Schweinfurth's hydrographical theories, and established the identity of the Welle and Ubangi rivers. The Mahdist rising prevented his return to Europe through the Sudan, as he had planned to do, in 1884, and an expedition, fitted out in 1885 by his brother in St Petersburg, failed to reach him. Junker then determined to go south. Leaving Wadelai on 2 January 1886 he travelled by way of Uganda and Tabora and reached Zanzibar in November 1886. In 1887 he received the gold medal of the Royal Geographical Society. As an explorer Junker is entitled to high rank, his ethnographical observations in the Niam-Niam (Azande) country being especially valuable although unsubstantiated in parts. He died at St. Petersburg.

== Bibliography ==
- Travels in Africa: During the years 1875-1878: Volume 1 (1890)
- Travels in Africa: During the years 1879-1883: Volume 2 (1891)
- Travels in Africa during the years 1882-1886: Volume 3 (1892)
