= Egyptian Equatoria =

Equatoria خط استواء (Ottoman Turkish) Hatt-ı İstivâ
- Directorate of the Khedivate of Egypt
- 1871–1889
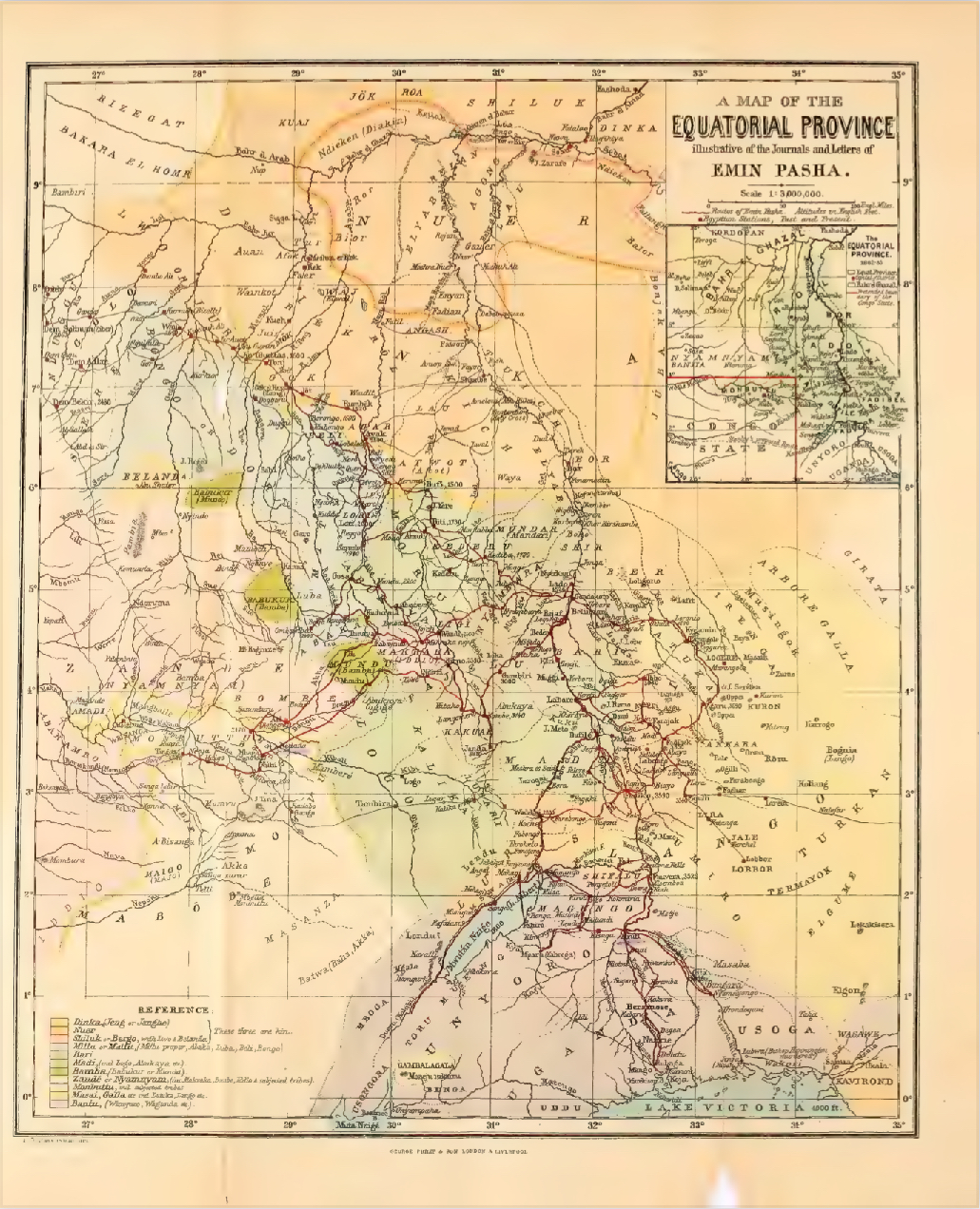
- Equatoria and its districts c.1882
- Capital: Ismailïa
- Government
- Director
  - 26 May 1871 - August 1873: Samuel White Baker
  - August 1873 - March 1874: Muhammad Rauf Pasha
  - March 1874 - October 1876: Charles George Gordon
  - October 1876 - May 1877: Henry Prout Bey
  - May 1877 - August 1877: Alexander Mason Bey
  - August 1877 - 1878: Ibrahim Pasha Fawzi
  - July 1878 - 1889: Emin Pasha
- History
  - Annexation of Gondokoro: 1871
  - Mahdist conquest: 1889
Preceded by	Succeeded by
Bari Kingdom	Mahdist State

Equatoria was a directorate of the Khedivate of Egypt in the late 19th century. It was located in modern-day South Sudan (Equatoria region), the Democratic Republic of the Congo, and Uganda. Equatoria, as an Egyptian province, was created on the 26th of May, 1871, following the formal annexation of Gondokoro by Egypt, which was organized by Samuel Baker. Throughout its early existence, the provincial administration in Gondokoro was plagued by instability, as conflict with slave traders and the native Bari tribes meant that the governor only controlled the areas around the capital and the forts. However, during its later existence, Equatoria experienced a “golden period”, where the province was self-sufficient, prosperous, and the Egyptians under Emin Pasha maintained positive relations with both the interlacustrine kingdoms, and the surrounding tribes. Ultimately however, the outbreak of the Mahdist War in the Sudan which severed communications with Khartoum and Cairo and led to the fall of Equatoria, as Mahdist offensives led by Karam Allāh Muḥammad Kurkusāwī surrounded the Egyptian forts, which forced Emin to withdraw south to Wadelai, until he finally abandoned the province in early 1889, following an expedition sent to relieve his forces.

== Background ==
Egyptian interests in the upper White Nile region begun under the reign of Muhammad Ali. In 1839, he assigned Salim Qapudan to find the source of the White Nile. Salim reached Gondokoro, and published his reports regarding the number of resources such as gold, slaves, and the state of the local tribes. While permanent Egyptian authority was not established, the expedition opened up the possibility of future Egyptian expansion, which would be manifested in the 1870s.

=== Initial expansion ===
In 1863, Isma'il became the Wāli of Egypt. Under his reign, the Egyptian interest in the White Nile was reinvigorated. Under the justification of ending slavery in the southern Sudan, the Egyptians managed to establish full control over the Upper Nile region.

== Administrative divisions ==
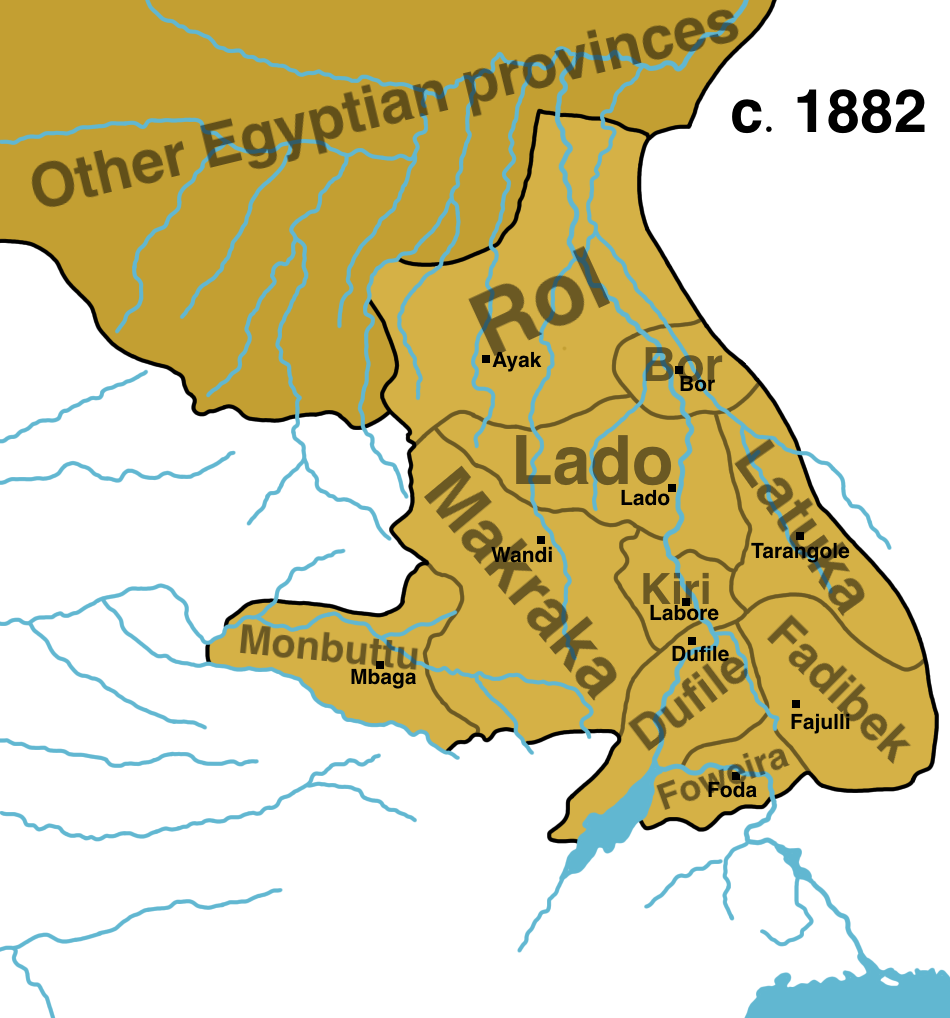

At its greatest extent in 1882, Equatoria was divided into 10 different districts. These were:

1. Rol
2. Bor
3. Lado
4. Kiri
5. Dufile
6. Foweira
7. Fadibek
8. Latuka
9. Makraka
10. Monbuttu
