= Dufile =

Colonial fort in Uganda

Dufile (also Dufilé, Duffli, Duffle, or Dufli) was originally a fort built by Emin Pasha, the Governor of Equatoria, in 1879; it is located on the Albert Nile just inside Uganda, close to a site chosen in 1874 by then-Colonel Charles George Gordon to assemble steamers that were carried there overland. Abandoned by Emin's people in January 1889, Dufile being within the Lado Enclave was reoccupied and reconstructed by Belgian forces from 1902 to 1907.

Today the name Dufile is applied to a nearby Madi village and sub-county in Moyo District to the east of Laropi. The name Dufile itself is a corruption of the Madi village name Odrupele. Emin and A.J. Mounteney Jephson were confined in the fort during a mutiny in 1888. There followed the Battle of Dufile when the former mutineers, after releasing Emin and Jephson, rallied to fight Mahdist forces.

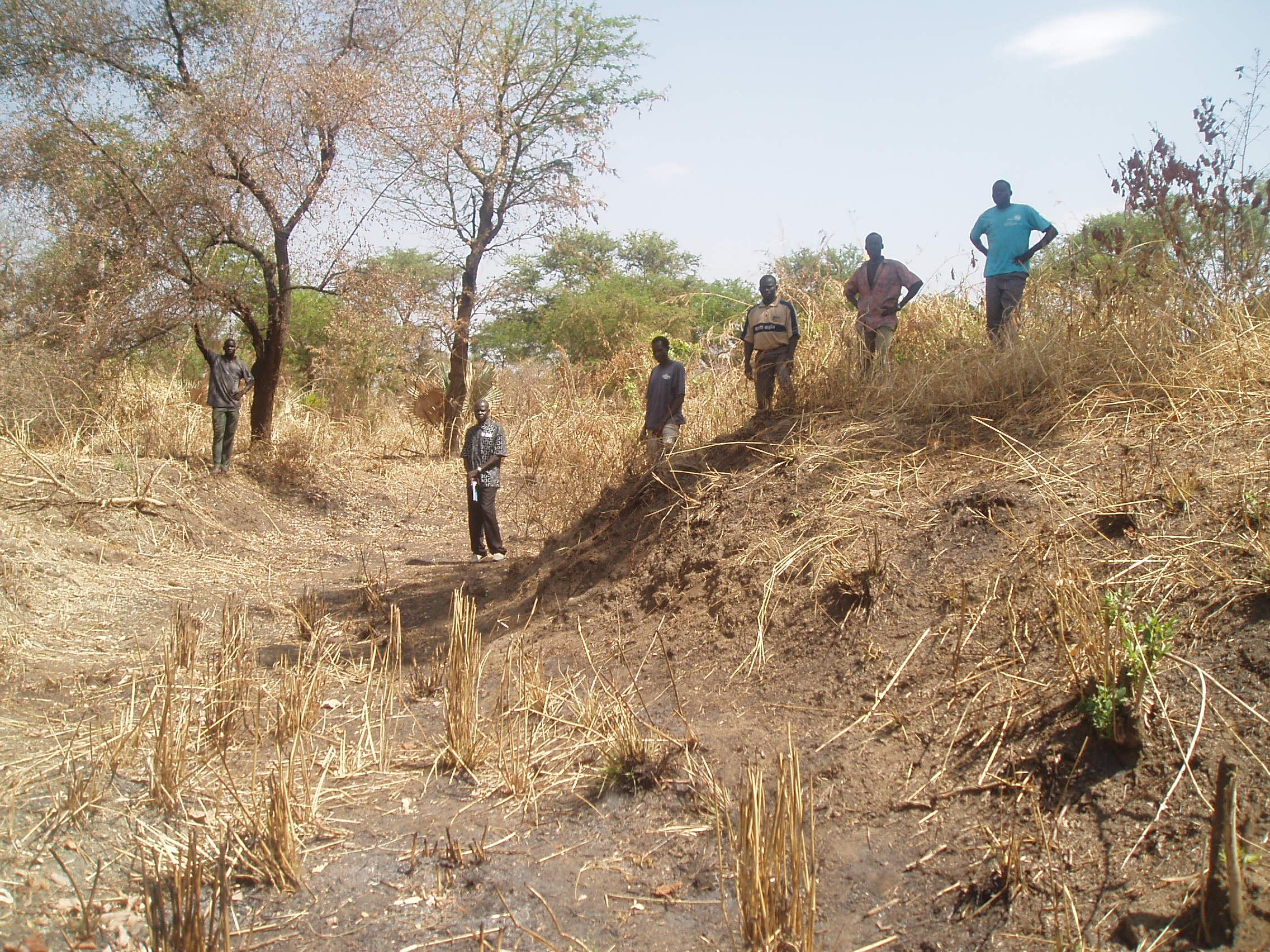
The north-east wall and ditch, January 2006

Dufile was visited by Alan Moorehead while he was researching his book The White Nile, published in 1960. The fort was surveyed in July 1965 by a student team from Imperial College. The fort, where a ditch and bank enclose an area of 12 acres (4.8 hectares), can be reached by road or boat from Laropi. Archaeological work was done between December 2006 and January 2007 by an international team and recommendations on conservation of the site are on file. Emin's old harbour is now the departure point for passenger ferries to Nimule in South Sudan.
