= Louis-Napoléon Chaltin =

Belgian career soldier and colonial official

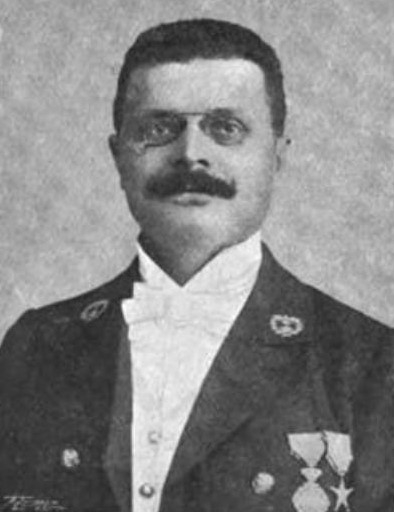

Commissioner of Aruwimi District
- In office 1892–1895

Personal details
- Born: 27 April 1857 Ixelles, Brussels, Belgium
- Died: 14 March 1933 (aged 75) Uccle, Brussels, Belgium
- Occupation: Soldier, civil servant

Military service
- Allegiance: Belgium; Congo Free State
- Branch/service: Belgian Army; Force Publique
- Years of service: 1873-1905
- Rank: Major
- Battles/wars: Mahdist War; Congo Arab war

Louis-Napoléon Chaltin (1857–1933) was a Belgian military officer and colonial official notable for his service in the Congo Free State during the late 19th century.

== Colonial career ==
Louis-Napoléon Chaltin was born in Ixelles, a suburb of Brussels, in Belgium on 27 April 1857. He was appointed a lieutenant in the Belgian Army in 1885 and entered the service of the recently created Congo Free State in 1891.

=== Congo Arab war ===
In 1893, at the time of the Congo Arab war, he was head of the Force Publique station at Basoko. He left this post to ascend the Lomami River to Bena-Kamba, then striking overland to Riba Riba, near present-day Kindu. Chaltin burned down Riba Riba. When rebuilt, the town took the name of Lokandu. He then raised the siege of the Stanley Falls station; now, Kisangani when it was falling to the Swahilis. He defeated the Arab-led forces on 18 May 1893. After defeating them again at Kirundu, the Arabs were expelled from the region. Chaltin secured the Dungu region in the northeast of the Free State and was commander of the Haut-Uélé district from 1893.

=== Failed Nile expedition ===
In 1896, King Leopold II decided to extend the Free State territory to the northeast. His forces were to advance first to the Lado Enclave on the Nile, which had been ceded to him but not yet occupied, and then northward towards Khartoum, capital of the declining Mahdist state of Sudan.

A force of 2,700 men led by Francis, Baron Dhanis was to march by way of the Aruwimi River, while Chaltin was given a force of 700 men to take a more northerly route along the Bomu River. Dhanis's force was mainly made up of ethnic Tetela, who rebelled and killed several Belgian officers, then went on the region's rampage. Dhanis managed to escape, but it was several years before the Batetela rebellion was suppressed. Chaltin managed to reach the Nile at Bedden in February 1897 and defeated the Mahdists there in the Battle of Rejaf. This consolidated Leopold's claim to the Upper Nile, but Chaltin did not have the forces to do more.

== Later life ==
Chaltin died in Uccle on 14 March 1933. He gave his name to the town of Aketi Port-Chaltin near Kisangani. After independence, the city was renamed Aketi in 1971.

== Sources ==
- Auzias, Dominique; Labourdette, Jean-Paul (2006). Congo: république démocratique. Petit Futé. ISBN 2-7469-1412-3.
- Degefu, Gebre Tsadik (2003). The Nile: Historical, Legal and Developmental Perspectives. Trafford Publishing. ISBN 1-4120-0056-4.
- Ewans, Martin (2002). European atrocity, African catastrophe: Leopold II, the Congo Free State and its aftermath. Routledge. ISBN 0-7007-1589-4.
- Lotar, L.; Coosemans, M. (1948). Biographie coloniale Belge. Vol. 1. Falk van Campenhout.
- Ndaywel è Nziem, Isidore (1998). Histoire generale du Congo. De Boeck Supérieur. ISBN 2-8011-1174-0.
- Archive Louis Chaltin, Royal museum for central Africa
