= Kirundu, Democratic Republic of the Congo =

Kirundu
- Village
- Location within Democratic Republic of the Congo
- Coordinates: 0.73333°S 25.53333°E
- Country: DR Congo
- Province: Tshopo
- Territory: Ubundu
- Chiefdom: Kirundu
- Time zone: UTC+2 (Central Africa Time)
- Climate: Af

Kirundu is a settlement in the Democratic Republic of the Congo. It is on the right bank of the Lualaba River, upstream from Ubundu.

In the late nineteenth century the town was capital of a slaving state headed by Kibonge, from the Comoro Islands, who was joined by a young Arab named Said ben Adeb who had been expelled from Nyangwe after his father died. In 1893 the Congo Free State officer Louis Napoléon Chaltin defeated the Swahili/Arab forces at Kirundu and expelled them from the Stanley Falls region.
