= Wadelai =

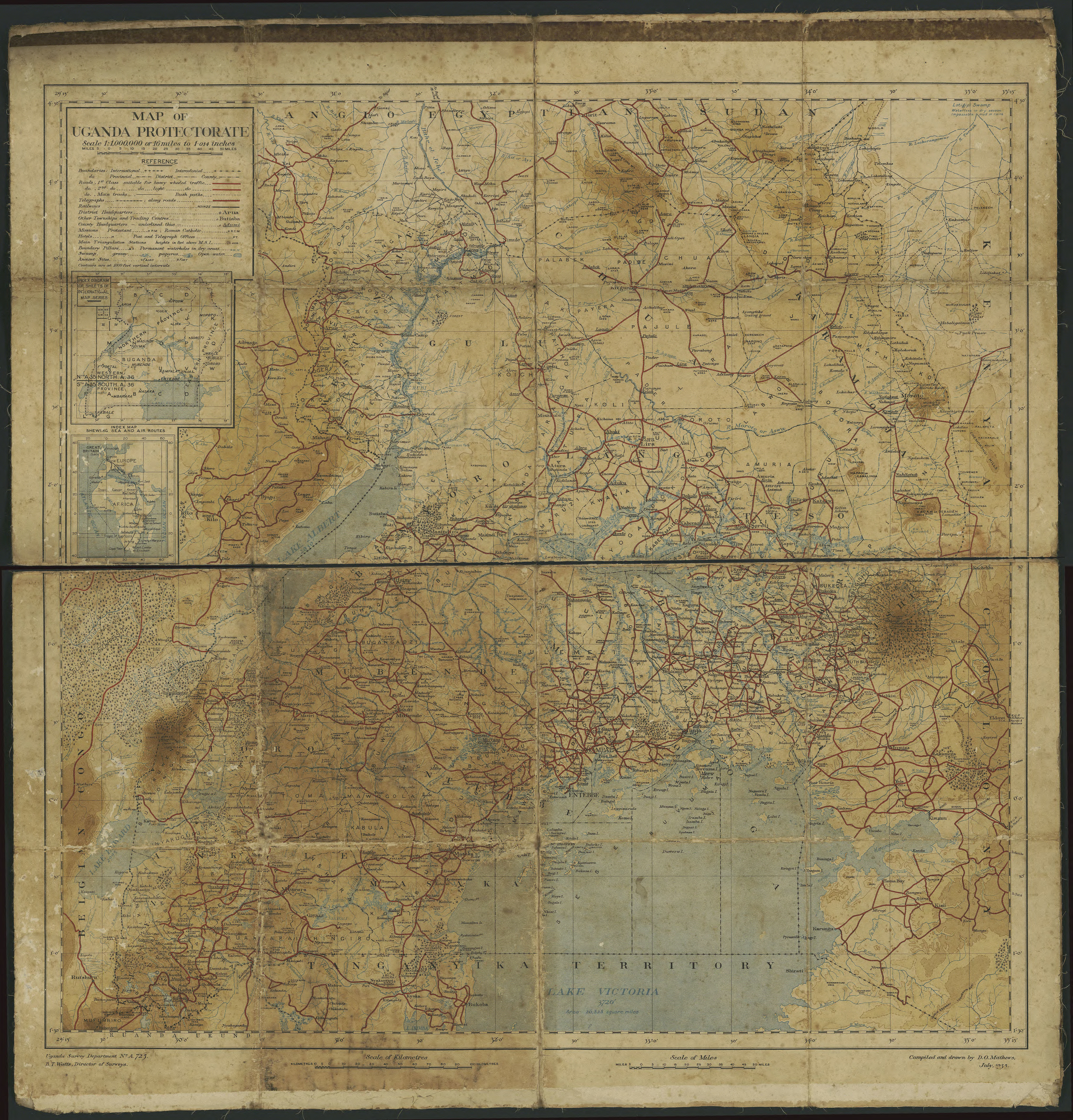
Two Wadelai stations, Emin's and British, marked on a 1935 map of Uganda Protectorate.

Wadelai was a boma at a narrow point on the Albert Nile in what is now northern Uganda. There were several shortlived colonial stations there, the first being the final chief station of Emin Pasha when Governor of Equatoria. Wadelai gives its name to a current Ugandan sub-county.

== History ==
Wadelai lay about 200 miles (320 km) in a straight line north-northwest of Entebbe, and 72 miles (116 km) by river downstream from Butiaba (on Lake Albert), just north of Lake Rubi, a swampy broad of papyrus and ambatch. The local Ragem were a Jonam branch of the Alur people, who migrated northwest under pressure from the Lango. The Ragem were first visited by Europeans in 1875, an expedition from Dufile sent by Gordon of Khartoum and led by Lieutenant William Harold Chippindall of the Royal Engineers, nephew of Edward Chippindall. In 1876 Romolo Gessi, exploring Lake Albert in the service of Gordon, named the Ragem area "Wadelai" after its chieftain, a vassal of Kabarega, king of Bunyoro. The chieftain's personal name was Fishwa or Pico; "Wadelai" (also "Wadlay", "Wat-el-Lai", Wo' Lei, or Walad Lāy) was a patronymic ("son of Lai") bestowed by the Sudanese. The region was annexed to the Egyptian Sudan and a site near Wadelai's village chosen as a government post. This post was on the western bank of the Nile, downstream (north) of the later British station.

Here for some time Emin Pasha had his headquarters, evacuating the place in December 1888. Thereafter, for some years, the district was held by the Mahdists. In 1894 the British established the Protectorate of Uganda after making treaties with regional chiefs, including the "sheikh of Wadelai". The British flag was hoisted at Wadelai, on both banks of the Nile, by Major E. R. Owen. The British built a government station at 2°47′N 31°30′E on the east bank on a hill 160 to 200 feet (50 to 60 m) above the Nile at a spot where the river narrows to 482 feet (147 m) and attains a depth of 30 feet (9 m). Alur chief Uŋwec called this site "East Wadelai". At this place was a gauge for measuring the discharge of the river. The Lado Enclave of the Congo Free State controlled the west bank from 1894 and the Belgians occupied Emin's old fort. Ewart Grogan passed through in 1899, and wrote, "A tiny lake, scarce five miles wide, smothered with weed, two insignificant hills, over one of which the Union Jack flutters on a crooked pole, some gravitation-defying huts, a sad-eyed Englishman, such is Wadelai". Grogan lamented that the Royal Artillery officer manning the station had to spend his time "sorting mails and retailing beads and yards of cloth", keeping him from "the really important work of inspecting the country and winning the confidence of the natives". The British government post was moved from Wadelai to Fatiko in 1906 and then Koba in 1907. At the same time the Belgian post closed as part of a general withdrawal from Lado. From then until the outbreak of the First World War, Wadelai was a base for poaching of elephants for the ivory trade. In 1910 the Smithsonian–Roosevelt African Expedition was allowed to hunt white rhinoceros.

Winston Churchill passing through in 1907 and described Wadelai as "newly abandoned to ruin". Theodore Roosevelt described the native settlement in 1910: "thatched huts surrounded by a fence .. small fields of mealies and beans, cultivated by the women, and a few cattle and goats; ... big wicker-work fish-traps". Sleeping sickness was endemic. There remained a weather station at Wadelai; the telegraph office was closed in May 1918. According to the 1929 Encyclopaedia Britannica, steamboats between Butiaba and Nimule were still calling at the Wadelai "native village".

Archaeological surveys were made of the remains of "Fort Emin Pasha" in 1935 by A. J. Rusk and in 1963 by Merrick Posnansky and the Brathay Exploration Group. In 1972 it was scheduled as a historical cultural site. A small hotel opened there in 2013, funded by the German government in memory of Emin's German origins.

A journalist visiting the British fort site in 2008 found it deserted and overgrown.

== Modern sub-county ==
Wadelai is a sub-county of Jonam County (formerly in Nebbi District but now in Pakwach District). There is a Magistrate Grade II Court in Wadelai. The sub-county has a total area of 248.6 square kilometres (96.0 sq mi). It is divided into the parishes of Mutir, Pakwinyo, Pumit, Ongwelle, and Ojigo, each in turn divided into villages. The parishes of Ragem Upper and Lower were in Wadelai sub-county at the time of the 2014 census but subsequently erected into a new sub-county named Ragem. The modern settlement of Wadelai is several kilometres from the west bank of the Nile at 2°43′27″N 31°23′33″E, where the road from Ajai Wildlife Reserve to Pakwach crosses the Ora River.

Wadelai subcounty chairperson election 2011
Party	Candidate	Votes	%
NRM	Leonard Opio Anywar	1,378	32
Independent	Pokech K. Francis Ayella	1,057	25
FDC	Lawrence Kertho	925	21
UPC	Ovuru Onenarach Aliga	500	12
Independent	John Olama	452	10

The 2016 chairperson election was won by independent Richard Okan with 1,799 votes.

In the 2021 Ugandan Presidential election, the Electoral Commission of Uganda recorded that 4,670 (62%) of 7,488 of voters registered in the sub-county cast ballots, 3,424 (73%) of them for incumbent and winner Yoweri Museveni.

== Sources ==
- Geographical Section, Naval Intelligence Division, Admiralty (1920). A Handbook of the Uganda Protectorate. Naval Intelligence Handbooks. Vol. I.D. 1217. London: H.M. Stationery Office.
- Grogan, Ewart Scott; Sharp, Arthur H. (Arthur Henry) (1900). From the Cape to Cairo; the first traverse of Africa from south to north. London: Hurst and Blackett.
- Roosevelt, Theodore (1910). African Game Trails. New York; London: Syndicate Publishing.
- Smith, Iain R. (1972). The Emin Pasha Relief Expedition 1886–1890. Oxford: Clarendon Press. ISBN 978-0-19-821679-7 – via Internet Archive.
- Southall, Aidan William (2004) [1956]. "Ch. XI: Adjustment to Alien Rule". Alur Society: A Study in Processes and Types of Domination. Classics in African Anthropology. Münster: LIT Verlag with the International African Institute. ISBN 978-3-8258-6119-3.
- Stigand, Chauncy Hugh (1968). Equatoria: the Lado Enclave. Cass.
