= Fort Patiko =

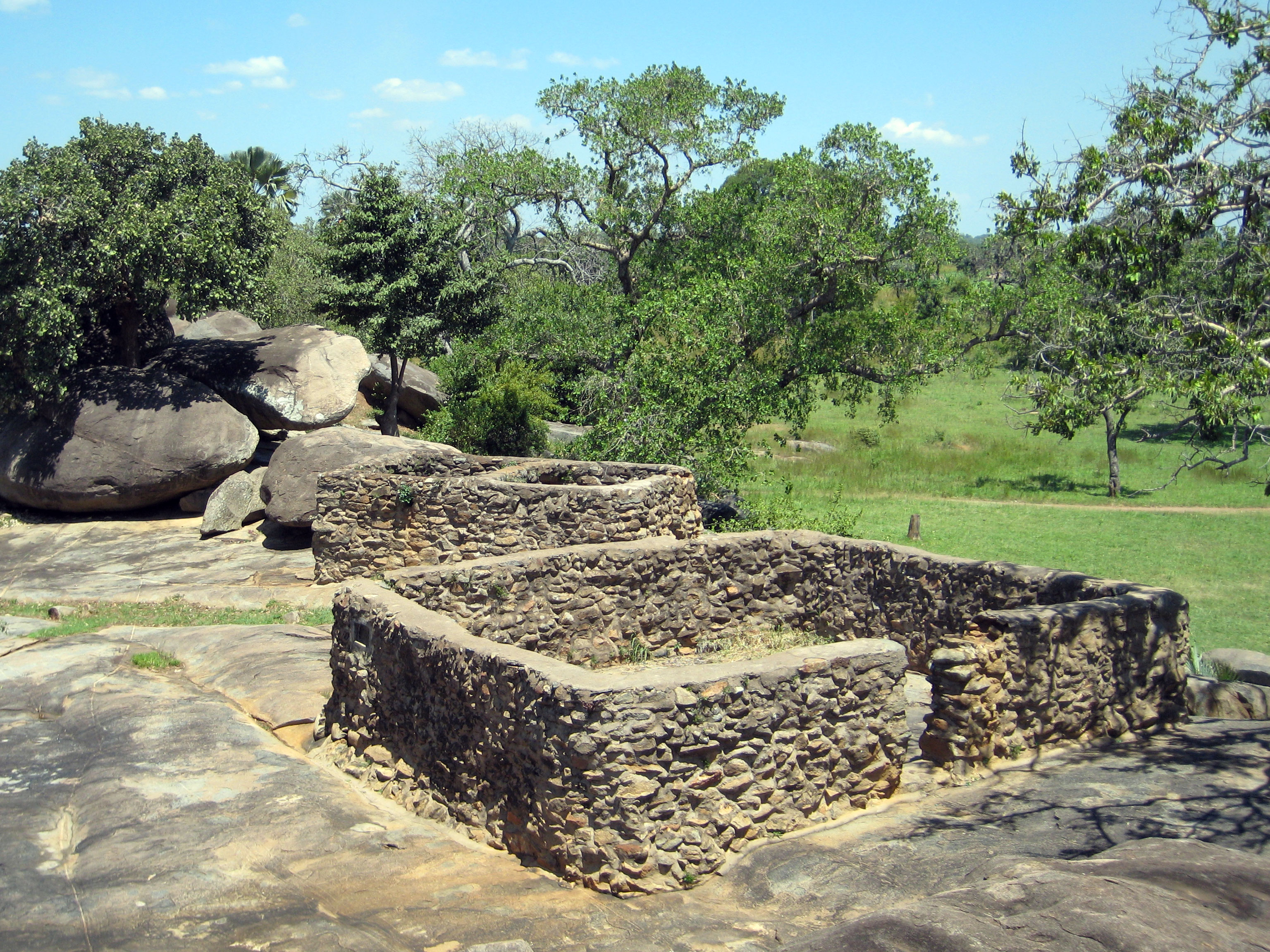
- Walls of Fort Patiko grain stores

Site information
- Owner: public
- Open to the public: yes
- Condition: ruined

Location
- Fort Patiko in Uganda
- Coordinates: 3.015834°N 32.317625°E

Site history
- Built: 1872
- Built by: Samuel Baker
- Materials: stone

Fort Patiko, also known as Baker's Fort, was a military fort built by Samuel Baker in Patiko, Uganda.

Construction of the fort was completed on December 25, 1872.

After Baker left in 1888, the fort was used by Emin Pasha and Charles Gordon while they served as Governor of the Equatorial Province of the British Uganda Protectorate. A plaque on the remaining wall of a grain storage building in the center of the fort reads “Fatiko 1872 -88, founded by Sir Samuel Baker, occupied by Emin and Gordon” (sic).

Ruins of the fort remain in Ajulu parish, Patiko sub-county, Aswa County, Gulu district. The site is open to the public subject to a fee levied by the subcounty.

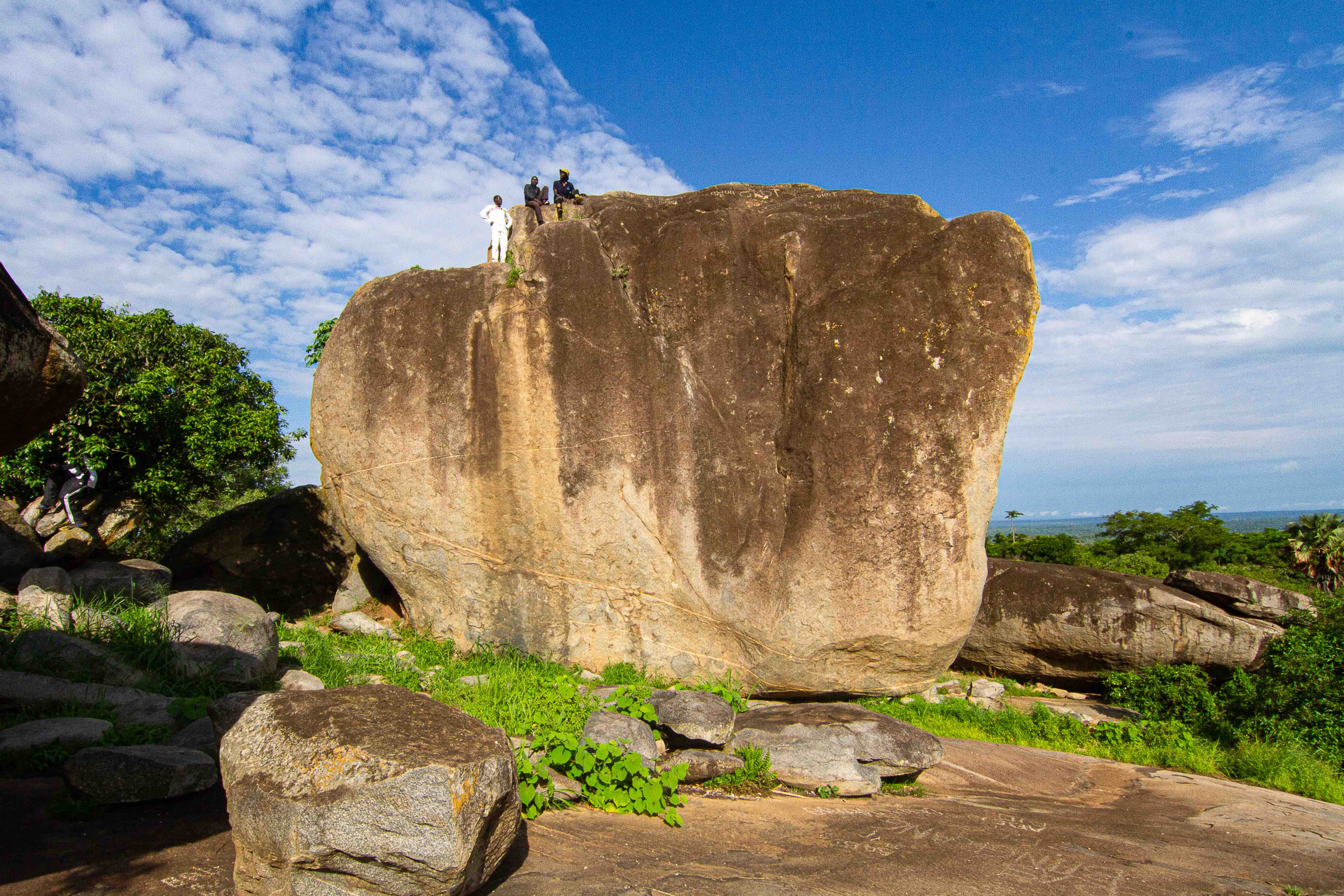
A watch tower rock for Fort Patiko

The Ugandan Government currently is planning on turning the Barker's fort to become a fully recognized national tourism site.
