= Emin Pasha =

German-born Ottoman physician (1840–1892)

Mehmed Emin Pasha
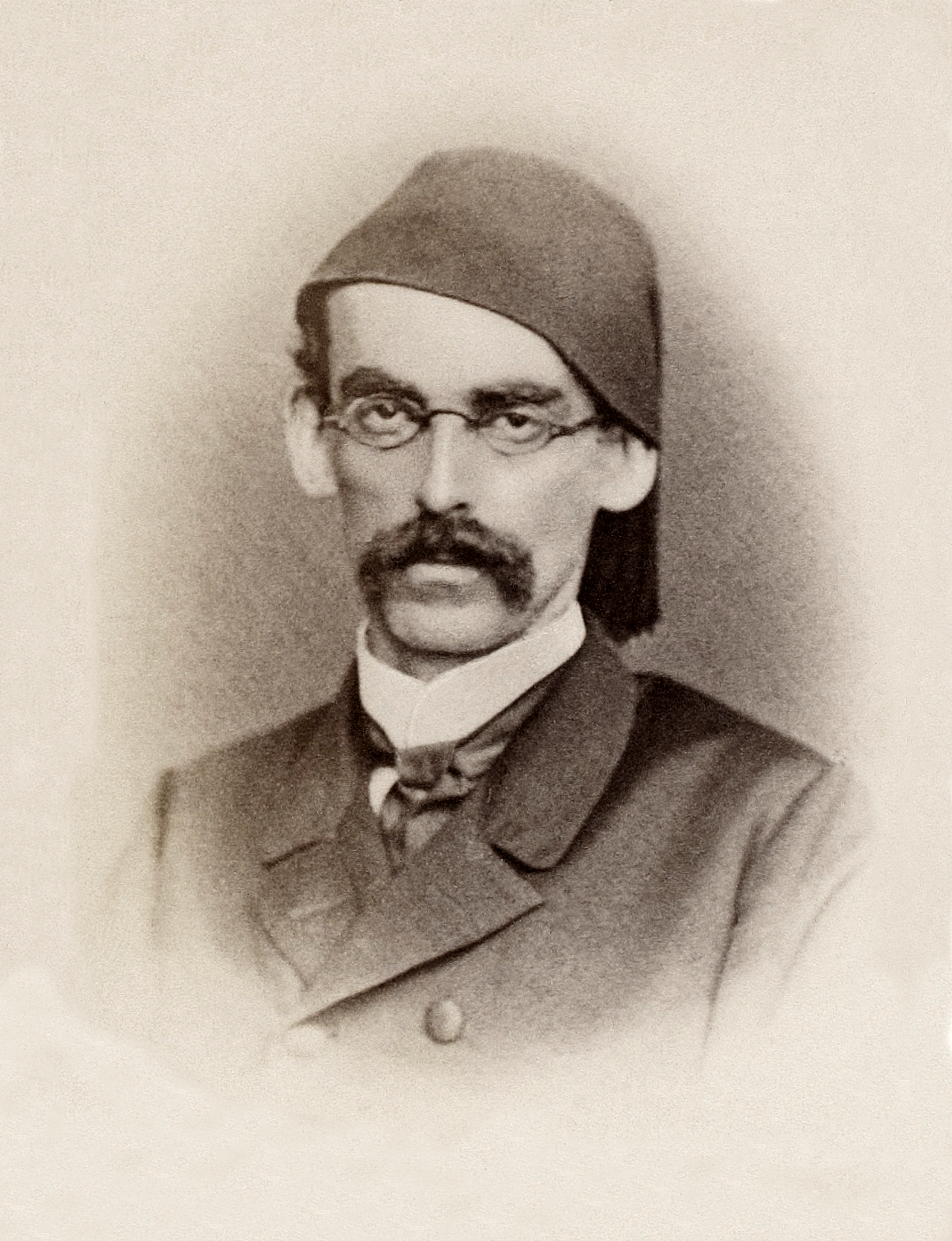
- in 1875
- Born: Isaak Eduard Schnitzer; March 28, 1840; Opole, Prussian Silesia
- Died: October 23, 1892 (aged 52); Kinena Station, Nyangwe, Congo Free State
- Awards: Vega Medal (1890)

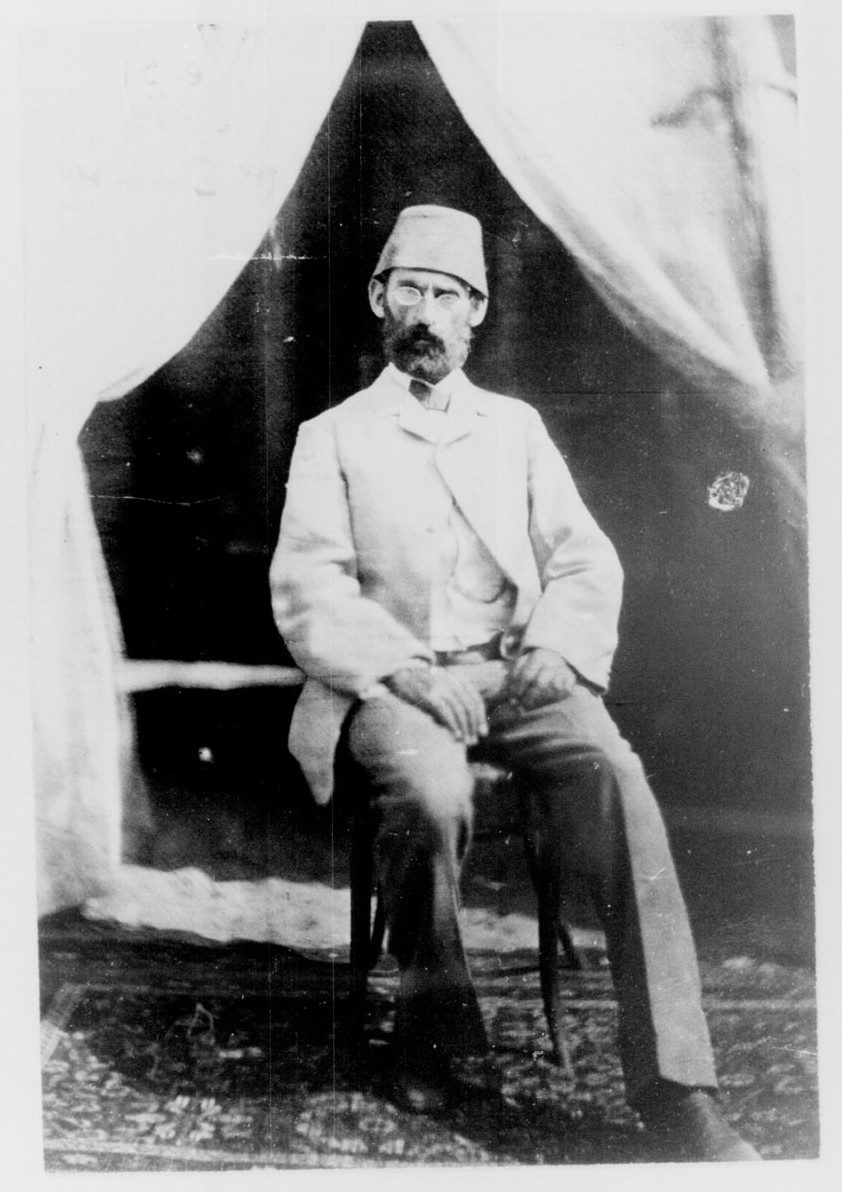
Schnitzer in 1884 photographed by French diplomat Louis-Pierre Vossion in Khartoum.

Mehmed Emin Pasha (born Isaak Eduard Schnitzer, baptized Eduard Carl Oscar Theodor Schnitzer; March 28, 1840 – October 23, 1892) was an Ottoman physician of German Jewish origin, naturalist, and governor of the Egyptian province of Equatoria on the upper Nile. The Ottoman Empire conferred the title "Pasha" on him in 1886, and thereafter he was referred to as "Emin Pasha".

== Early life ==
Emin was born in Oppeln (in present-day Poland), Silesia, into a middle-class German Jewish family, who moved to Neisse (now Nysa) when he was two years old. After the death of his father in 1845, his widowed mother married a Christian; she and her children were baptized as Lutherans. Emin was a student at the Kolegium Carolinum Neisse in Neisse, Silesia. He later studied at the universities at Breslau, Königsberg, and Berlin, where he qualified as a physician in 1864. But, he was disqualified from practice, and left Germany for Constantinople. There he intended to enter service in the Ottoman Empire.

Travelling via Vienna and Trieste, he stopped at Antivari in Montenegro, where he was welcomed by the local community, and was soon able to practice medicine. He put his linguistic talent to good use, as well, adding Turkish, Albanian, and Greek to his repertoire of languages. He became the quarantine officer of the port, leaving only in 1870 to join the staff of Ismail Hakki Pasha, governor of northern Albania. In the service, he travelled throughout the Ottoman Empire, although the details are little-known.

== Turco-Egyptian Sudan ==
When Hakki Pasha died in 1873, Emin went back to Neisse with the pasha's widow and children, where he passed them off as his own family, but left suddenly in September 1875, reappearing in Cairo and then departing for Khartoum, where he arrived in December. At this point he took the name "Mehemet Emin" (Arabic Muhammad al-Amin), started a medical practice, and began collecting specimens of plants, animals, and birds, many of which he sent to museums in Europe. Although some regarded him as a Muslim, it is not clear if he ever actually converted.

Charles George Gordon (‘Gordon of Khartoum’), then governor of Egyptian Equatoria, heard of Emin's presence and invited him to be the chief medical officer of the province; Emin assented and arrived there in May 1876. Gordon immediately sent Emin on diplomatic missions to Bunyoro and to Muteesa I of Buganda to the south, where Emin's modest style and fluency in Luganda were quite popular. After 1876, Emin made Lado his base for collecting expeditions throughout the region.

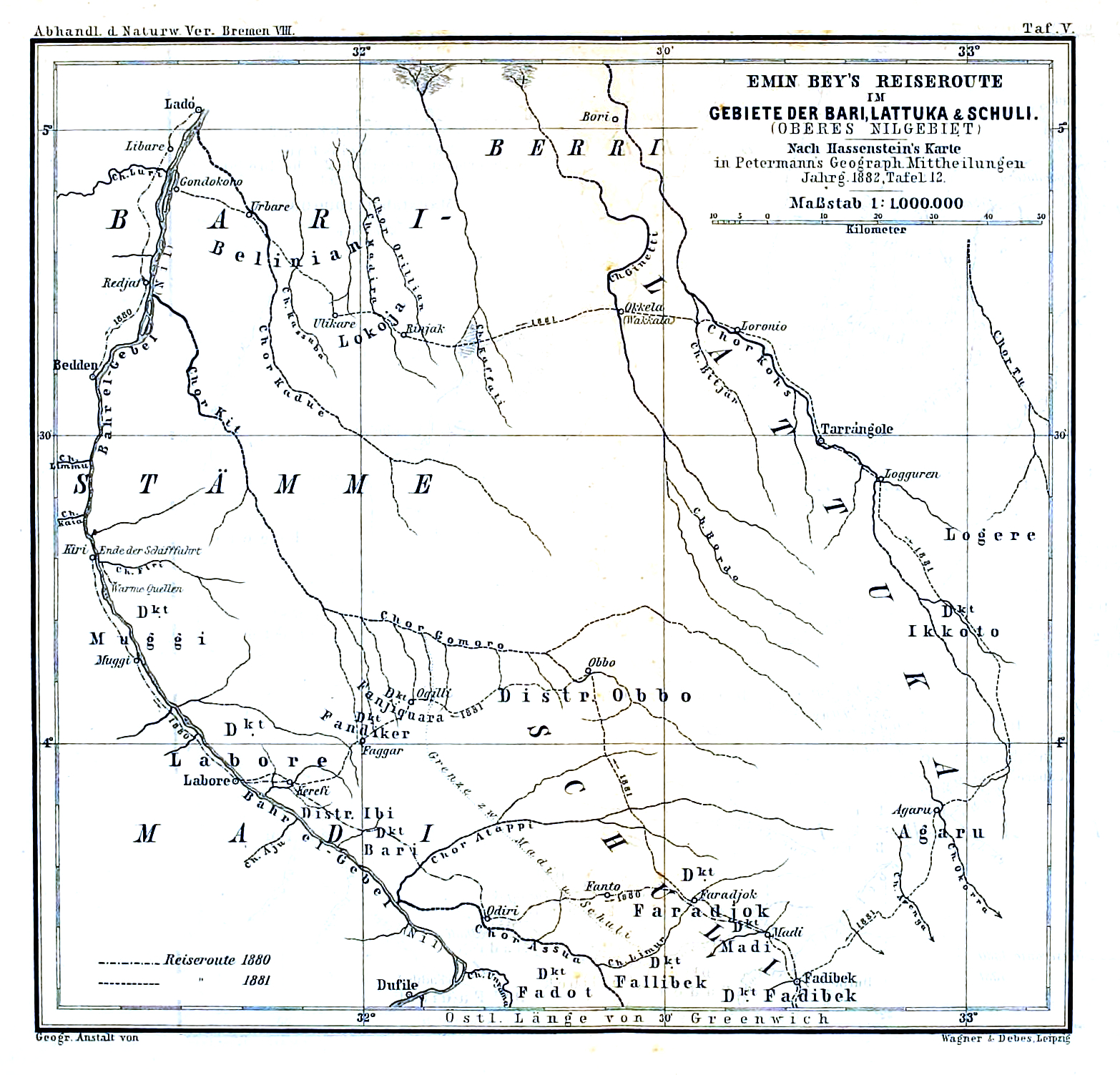
Emin Bey's travels

=== Governor of Equatoria ===
In 1878, the Khedive of Egypt appointed Emin governor of Equatoria, giving him the title of Bey. Despite the grand title, there was little for Emin to do; his military force consisted of a few thousand soldiers who controlled no more than a mile's radius around each of their outposts, and the government in Khartoum was indifferent to his proposals for development. He showed himself to be a bitter foe of slavery. In 1879 General Gordon gave Frank Lupton command of a flotilla of river steamers to relieve Emin. When Lupton reached Lado almost two years later, he found that Emin did not want to be relieved. He became Emin's deputy, in charge of the Latuka district based at Tarangole.

The revolt of Muhammad Ahmad that began in 1881 had cut Equatoria off from the outside world by 1883, and the following year, Karam Allah marched south to capture Equatoria and Emin. In 1885, Emin and most of his forces withdrew further south, to Wadelai near Lake Albert. Cut off from communications to the north, he was still able to exchange mail with Zanzibar through Buganda. Determined to remain in Equatoria, his communiques, carried by his friend Wilhelm Junker, aroused considerable sentiment in Europe in 1886, particularly acute after the death of Gordon the previous year.

==== Relief Expedition ====
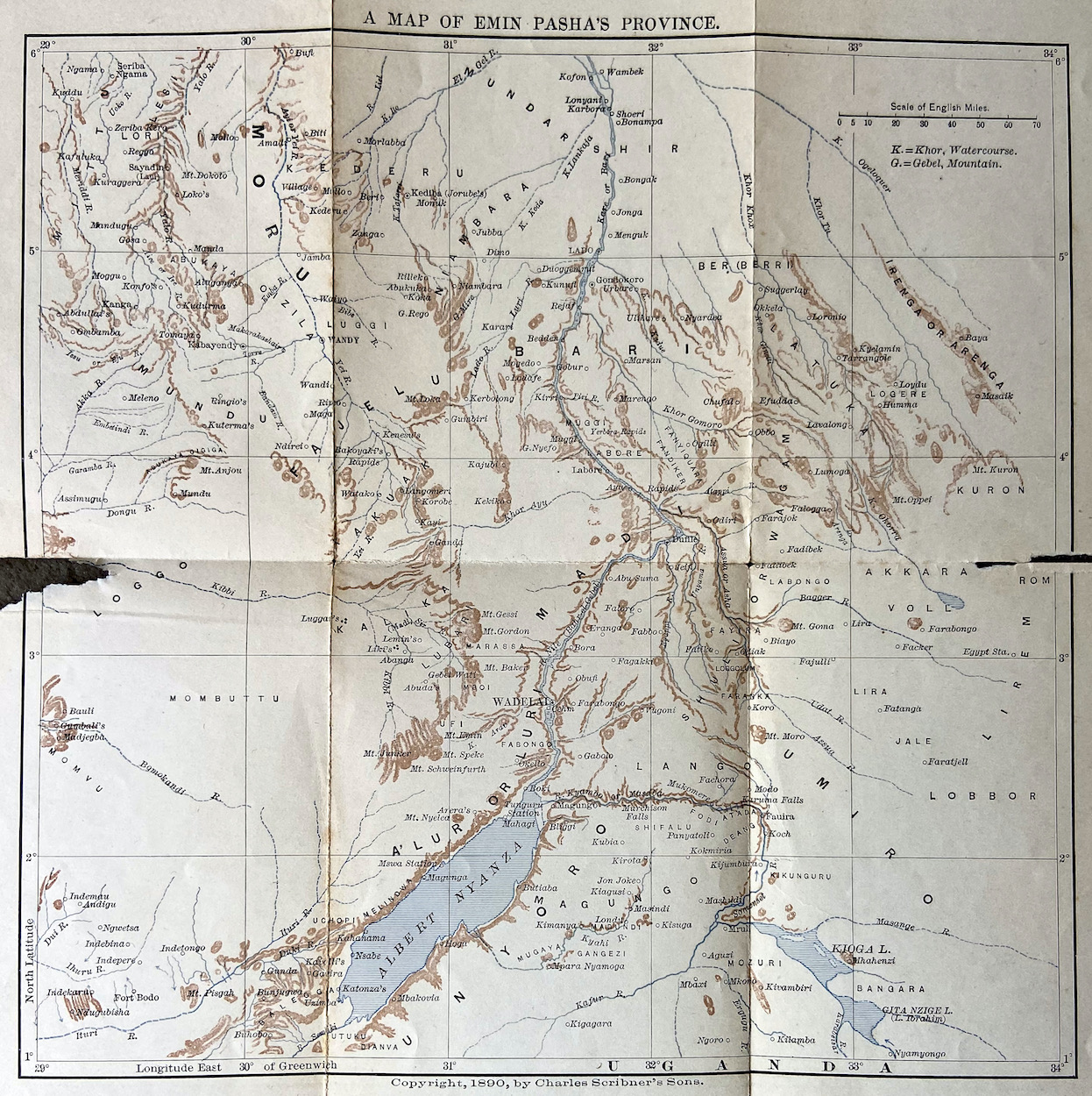
Map from Stanley’s book ‘In Darkest Africa’

The Emin Pasha Relief Expedition, led by Henry Morton Stanley, undertook to rescue Emin by going up the Congo River and then through the Ituri Forest, an extraordinarily difficult route that resulted in the loss of two-thirds of the expedition. Precise details of this trek are recorded in the published diaries of the expedition's non-African "officers" (e.g., Major Edmund Musgrave Barttelot, Captain William Grant Stairs, Mr. Arthur Jephson, and Thomas Heazle Parke, surgeon of the expedition).

Stanley met Emin in April 1888, and after a year spent in argument and indecision, during which Emin and Jephson were imprisoned at Dufile by troops who mutinied from August to November 1888, Emin was convinced to leave for the coast. The bulk of his forces remained near Lake Albert until 1890, when Frederick Lugard took them with him to Kampala Hill, where they participated in the Battle of Kampala Hill.

Stanley and Emin arrived in Bagamoyo in 1890. During celebrations, Emin was injured when he stepped through a window he mistook for an opening to a balcony. He spent two months in a hospital recovering, while Stanley left without being able to bring him back in triumph.

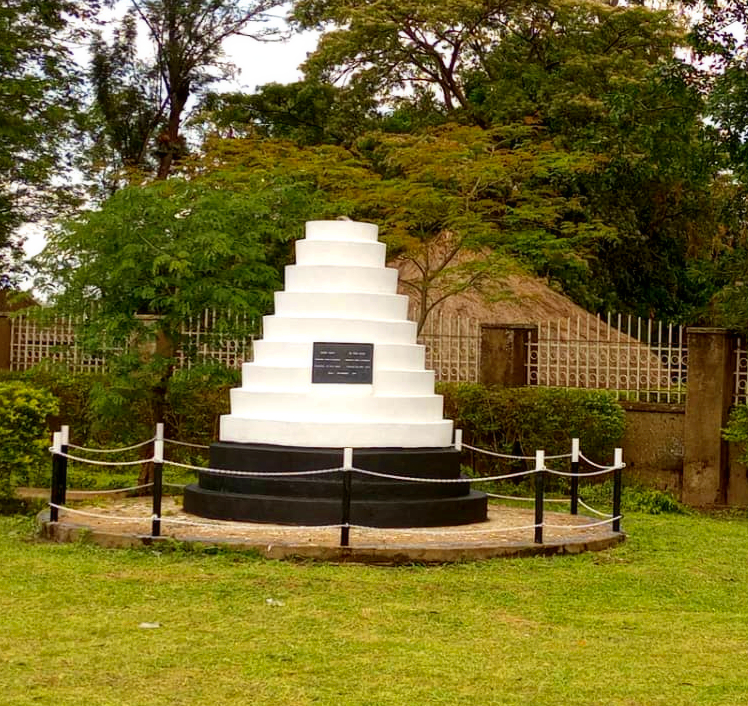
Emin Pasha monument in Uganda (2022)

The introduction of sleeping sickness in Uganda was attributed to the movement of Emin and his followers. Prior to the 1890s, sleeping sickness was unknown in Uganda, but the tsetse fly was probably brought by Emin from the Congo territory.

=== Death ===
Emin then entered the service of the German East Africa Company and accompanied Dr. Franz Stuhlmann on an expedition to the lakes in the interior, but was killed by two Arab slave traders at Kinena Station in the Congo Free State, near Nyangwe, on 23 or 24 October 1892.

== Legacy ==
He added greatly to the anthropological knowledge of central Africa and published valuable geographical papers. In 1890 he was awarded the Founder's Medal of the Royal Geographical Society.

== Taxon named in his honor ==
Emin Pasha is commemorated in the scientific name of an East African species of leptotyphlopid snake, Emin Pasha's worm snake Leptotyphlops emini, and an East African species of Passer sparrow, the chestnut sparrow Passer eminibey. He is also honoured in both the specific name and common name of Emin's shrike (Lanius gubernator), the specific name means governor.

== See also ==
- Emin Pasha Relief Expedition
