= Battle of Kampala Hill =

The Battle of Kampala Hill was fought between Catholics and Protestants on 24 January 1892 at Kampala Hill in what is now Uganda.

Frederick Lugard had been appointed Military Administrator of Uganda by the British East Africa Company, following the Anglo-German treaty of 1890. Arriving in Kampala in December 1891 he was originally ordered to return to Mombasa as the company did not see any profits accruing from his presence there. However, when the Protestant Church Mission Society helped William McKinnon (Free Church of Scotland) to raise £40,000, he received new orders to remain. When Lugard arrived, he supported the pro-British Protestants against the pro-French Catholics.
