= Karam Allāh Muḥammad Kurkusāwī =

Dongolāwī Mahdist emir

Karam Allāh Muḥammad Kurkusāwī (Note: Also spelled Karamallah and Kurqusawi.) (died 1903) was a Dongolāwī Mahdist emir (amīr). Born on the island of Kurkus, near Shendi, Karam Allāh worked with slave traders in the Baḥr al-Ghazāl in his youth. In 1882 he went to al-Ubaiyaḍ to enlist with the Mahdists.

In 1884 Muḥammad Aḥmad al-Mahdī sent Karam Allāh back to the Baḥr al-Ghazāl as emir and gave him an army. He captured the Egyptian governor, Frank Lupton (Lupton Bey), and the garrison. In 1885, when the Rizaiqāt of southern Dār Fūr rebelled by accepting as refugess some mutinous Mahdists from al-Ubaiyaḍ, Karam Allāh and his brother, Muḥammad Shaikh, led a large army against him. When the Rizaiqāt chief Madībbū Bey ʿAlī refused a summons, his forces were attacked near Shaqqa. They lost the ensuing battle and Madībbū fled north. He was eventually captured by Yūsuf Ibrāhīm and turned over to Karam Allāh, who sent him on to Omdurman.

In 1896 he was wounded in the Battle of Ferkeh. In 1898, when the Mahdists were defeated, he fled to the court of ʿAlī Dīnār, sultan of Dār Fūr. He was eventually executed at al-Fāṣhar on suspicion of intriguing against the sultan.

== Sources ==
- Hill, Richard Leslie, ed. (1967). "Karam Allāh Muḥammad Kurkusāwī". A Biographical Dictionary of the Sudan (2nd ed.). Frank Cass and Company. pp. 196–97.
- Daly, M. W. (2007). Darfur's Sorrow: A History of Destruction and Genocide. Cambridge University Press.
