= Nsala of Wala in the Nsongo District =

1904 photograph by Alice Seeley Harris

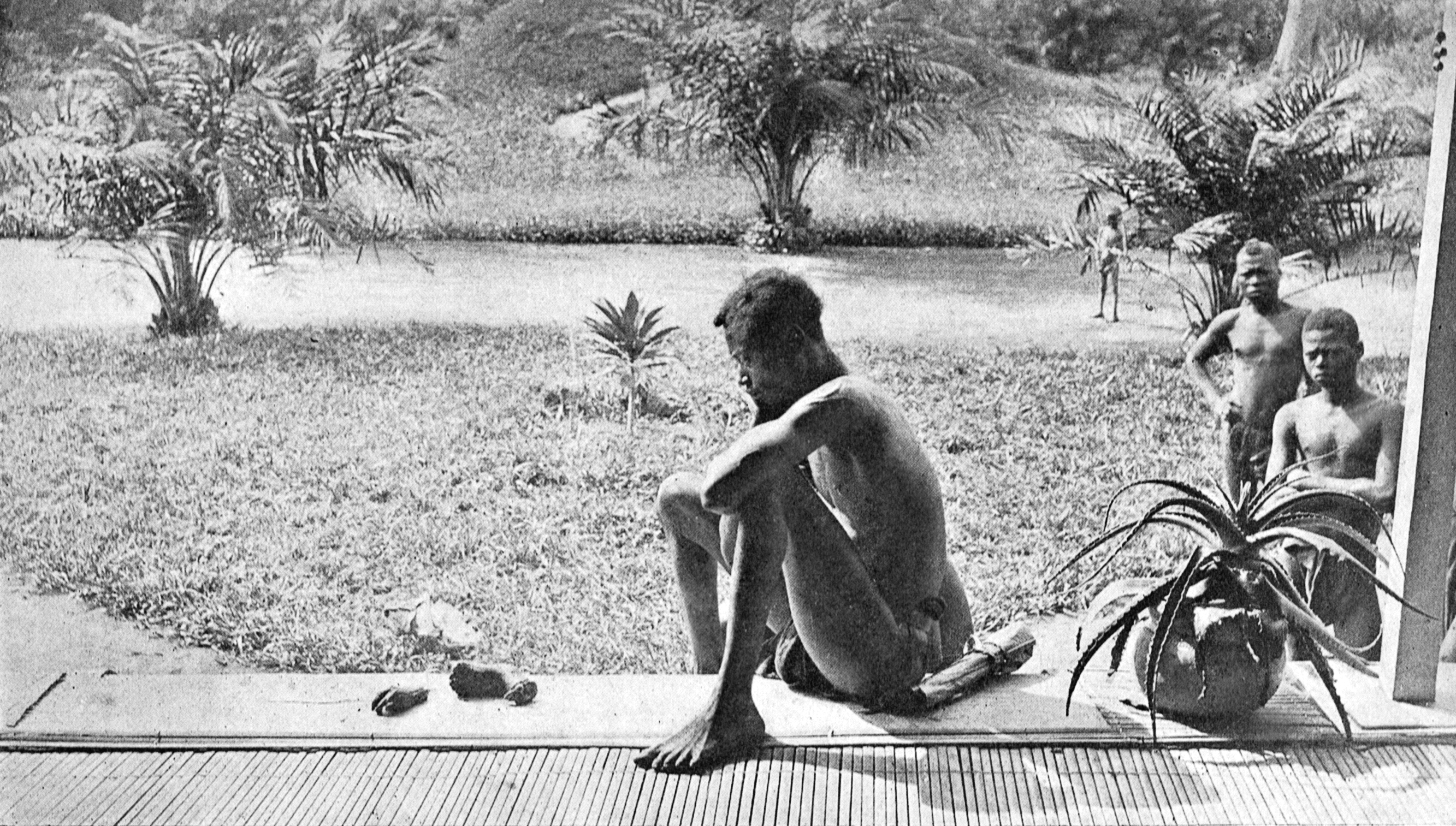
The picture as printed in King Leopold's Rule in Africa

Nsala of Wala in the Nsongo District (Abir Concession) is a photograph published by Edmund Dene Morel in his book King Leopold's Rule in Africa, in 1904. The image depicts a Congolese man named Nsala looking at the severed foot and hand of his five-year-old daughter, Boali. The girl, her mother, and a local boy had been killed, cooked, and eaten by a group of fifteen armed guards of the Abir Congo Company, which had a concession by the Congo Free State to collect rubber in the region. The guards had arrived early and were annoyed when they found that the rubber quota requested from the village was not yet ready. Three other persons had been wounded in their attack (one of them fatally) and ten villagers, mostly women, were taken captive by the guards.

The photograph was taken by Alice Seeley Harris, the wife of a missionary, in the neighbouring village of Baringa on 14 May 1904, one day after the girl's death. Nsala had secretly picked up Boali's hand and foot as evidence of the murders while the guards were preparing the dismembered bodies for cooking. When Harris heard what had happened and that the cut-off limbs were all that remained of the child after the cannibal meal, she was so appalled that she decided to document the scene, taking the photo on the mission veranda.

The photo was subsequently employed in a media campaign against the inhumane situation in the Congo Free State, which was characterised by an exploitative policy of forced rubber harvesting. It is part of the Harris Papers, a collection owned by Anti-Slavery International.

== Description ==
The picture shows a man dressed only in a loincloth sitting on the edge of a veranda in the centre of the picture, photographed from the veranda. His gaze is directed in front of him, towards the bottom left of the picture, at the severed hand and foot of a child lying on the veranda. In the right-hand half of the picture, further back in the picture, standing in front of the veranda, two other male figures, equally clothed, can be seen looking towards the viewer of the picture. A fourth person stands in the background of the picture, also in the right-hand half (the picture was printed in various sections and partly mirror-inverted; the position and directional details refer to Morel's print).

== Historical background ==
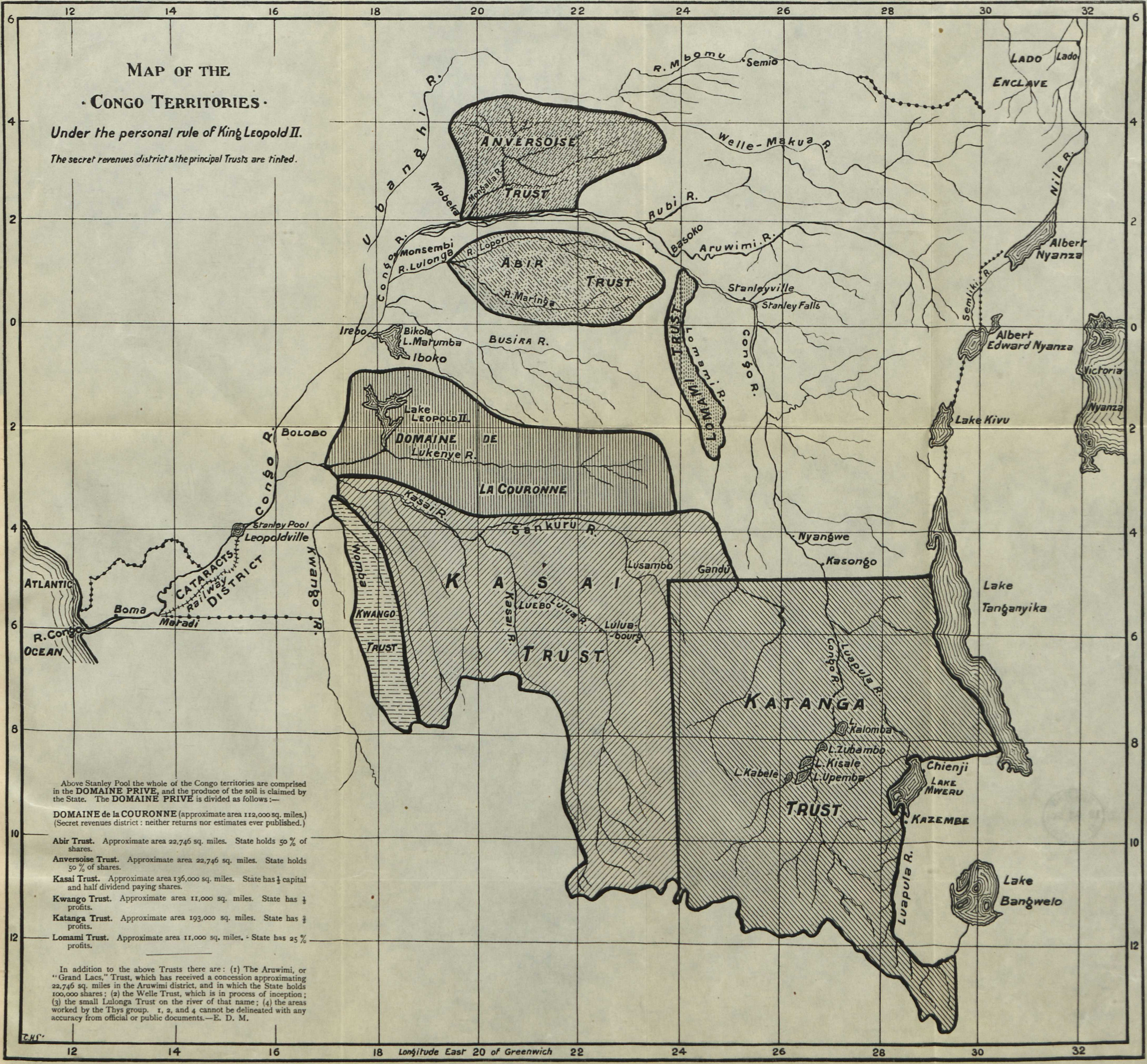
Map of the Congo Free State, published in 1904. The concession areas of various rubber companies are shown, the area of the Abir Congo Company concession can be seen approximately in the centre of the upper half.

The Berlin Conference of 1884–1885 resulted in the effective grant of the Congo Free State to King Leopold II of Belgium as personal property. During the period of the Free State, the population was subjected to a systematic policy of forced rubber harvesting. The enforcement of these policies resulted in numerous instances of abuse and a significant number of deaths. By the end of the nineteenth century, there was a considerable demand for rubber, which made this form of exploitation highly lucrative for Leopold. Initially, the atrocities resulting of this exploitation were either negated or concealed. The magnitude of the population decline over the period is disputed, with modern estimates ranging from 1.2 million to 10 million, based on estimates by witnesses and census data.

The coercive measures were subsequently enforced by the Force Publique, the Free State army, and by private militias from the rubber companies involved, such as the Anglo-Belgian India Rubber Company (Abir). Both forces recruited in the Free State and those from other African regions were deployed. In 1877, the first Baptist missionaries from Great Britain began work in the area that would become the Free State. They were later joined by American and Belgian groups from various denominations. According to Leopold and the missionaries, colonialism in the Congo served the purpose of "civilisation" and was largely driven by conversion to Christianity. They emphasised that this was linked to the fight against the western and eastern slave trades, cannibalism, and polygamy.

At the beginning of the 20th century, reports about the conditions in the Congo Free State began to attract significant attention in the Western world, leading to a growing chorus of public criticism of Leopold's policies. The Congo Reform Association, co-founded by Edmund D. Morel, was particularly influential. Missionaries and missionary societies also publicly denounced the situation in the state. The advent of photography made their alerts more effective, with images documenting cruelties reaching the public via newspapers, magazines, and lantern shows. The relatively new possibilities of mass reproduction of photos via printing screens and the development of faster, lighter, smaller and less expensive cameras also contributed to this.

Leopold attempted to counteract the criticism through lobbying and public relations work and by setting up a commission of inquiry. But in the end, the critics were successful and in 1908 Belgium decided to annex the Congo as a regular colony, ending Leopold's private rule.

Abir posts in the Lopori–Maringa Basin

Abir held a concession to exploit the forest resources of the Lopori–Maringa basin. The location depicted in the photograph, Baringa, is situated on the Maringa River, to the south-east of the town of Basankusu. There the two rivers converge and since 1893 Abir had its headquarters there. Following a reorganisation of the company in 1898, the Congo Free State held a 50% stake in Abir, with the remaining shares distributed among a Belgian banker and the Société Anversoise, another rubber company based in the Congo. The rubber was obtained in the Abir region through the tapping of certain vines, predominantly of the subspecies Landolphia owariensis gentilii. The repeated cutting of tendrils for tapping caused them to dry out and sometimes die. Completely severing tendrils during tapping killed them. In 1904, the year the photograph was taken, it was reported that the rubber reserves within 50 miles of most of Abir's posts had been nearly exhausted. As a result, the amount of rubber exported through Abir fell by approximately 50% between 1903 and 1904.

Before they were forced to harvest rubber, most inhabitants of the Lopori–Maringa basin were engaged in subsistence production, mostly agriculture, but also fishing and hunting. Already in the decades before the establishment of the Congo Free State, the region had suffered from armed conflicts and raids for enslavement. In the 1880s, it was repeatedly raided by traders from Irebu, who seized ivory and took captives to sell them as slaves.

The Abir Congo Company had posts scattered throughout the area, each responsible for a region and staffed by one or two European employees who received commissions on the rubber delivered and whose salaries were reduced if a quota was not met. Based on the number of men in a village, the posts in turn set rubber quotas for each village, which the Abir guards were responsible for collecting. If the quotas were not met, the guards were threatened with pay cuts, dismissal, imprisonment, or flogging. While a few guards ("post sentries") were equipped with comparatively modern Albini-Braendlin rifles, the guards stationed in the villages ("village sentries") used muzzleloaders. The sentries were sometimes required to produce a right hand (of the person supposedly killed) for each used cartridge to prove that they had not "wasted" it. Abir was supported by the state army in the form of logistical support and weapons licences. If they encountered strong resistance from the population, they could rely on state troops based in Basankusu to suppress it.

While the men forced to collect rubber received nominal pay for it, the company had prisons where men who failed to meet their quotas were held and forced to work. Wives or other close relatives were often taken hostage instead, which had the advantage of allowing the man to continue collecting rubber. If villages failed to meet their quotas, their leaders were often taken hostage.

The village of Wala was in the domain of Nsongo Mboyo, a group of settlements within the boundaries of the Abir concession, situated east of Baringa and north of the Maringa. In 1903, over 1,000 individuals from Nsongo Mboyo who had attempted to flee the concession area were forcibly relocated to the Lireko labour camp. According to historian Ben Kiernan, Abir personnel killed 83 people in Wala alone in May 1904.

== Local situation ==
John Harris, husband of Alice Harris, provided testimony before the Commission of Inquiry into Crimes in the Congo, an entity appointed by Leopold in 1904. "So far as we are aware, no single sentry had ever been punished by the State till 1904 for the many murders committed in this district." Edgar Stannard, a medical missionary in Baringa, informed the Commission that the Abir guards had utilised Albini rifles, which they were legally prohibited from carrying, to suppress riots in Nsongo. Harris and Stannard additionally indicated that Abir administrators had guards flogged if they had not killed a sufficient number of people. John Harris stated in 1905 that the guards in the Nsongo district were known for engaging in cannibalistic practices.

Stannard recounted statements by Nsongo residents indicating that guards from the area were originally deployed but were subsequently relieved of their duties and disarmed by "the white man" due to their failure to kill "their own people". They were then replaced by guards from areas known for cannibalism. Robert M. Burroughs posits that Harris's characterisation of the guards as "ignorant, uncivilized and to a large extent cannibal" represents an instance of a comparatively progressive-minded individual adopting the idioms of the defenders of the Free State, thereby problematising the missionaries' narratives of indigenous statements as an expression of the missionaries' point of view, set against the backdrop of their opposition to many expressions of cultural autonomy.

== Events leading to the photograph's creation ==
The events that form the background to the picture are described in detail in the letters written by the Harrises and Stannards. On 15 May 1904, Alice Harris corresponded with Raoul Van Calcken, the head of the Abir post at Baringa. The Baringa missionaries John Harris and Edgar Stannard corresponded with the founder and then head of the Baptist Congo-Balolo Mission, which employed the Harrises, and the co-founder of the Congo Reform Association, Henry Grattan Guinness, on 19 and 21 May, respectively. A review of Stannard's letter reveals the following sequence of events:

On 14 May 1904, the day of the shooting, John Harris had travelled to a meeting in Jikau. Shortly after 8 a.m. that morning, while Alice Harris and Stannard were at the Harris residence, two boys at the mission informed them that guards had killed several people and that two men were en route, bearing hands as evidence. The boys were instructed to notify Harris and Stannard if the men returned. Subsequently, the men arrived at the residence of Harris and Stannard and were requested to display the hands. One of the men presented a hand and foot, which Stannard estimated to be recent and belonging to a child of approximately five years of age. One of the two men, Nsala from Wala, identified himself as the father of the deceased Boali, whose limbs they had been.

The men told that fifteen guards had arrived in Wala the previous day intending to collect rubber, despite the scheduled delivery date having been set for three days later. Two of the assailants were armed with Albini rifles. When the guards heard that the expected amount of rubber was not yet ready, they started to shoot, killing three people: the girl Boali, Nsala's wife Bonginganoa, and a ten-year-old boy named Esanga. The three victims were then dismembered, cooked, and eaten. Three other individuals had sustained gunshot wounds, one of whom, Eikitunga, had fallen into a river during her escape and drowned. Furthermore, the guards had apprehended ten individuals, nine of whom were women, though women were not responsible for rubber collection. Eight of the women were released when the villagers agreed to pay a ransom.

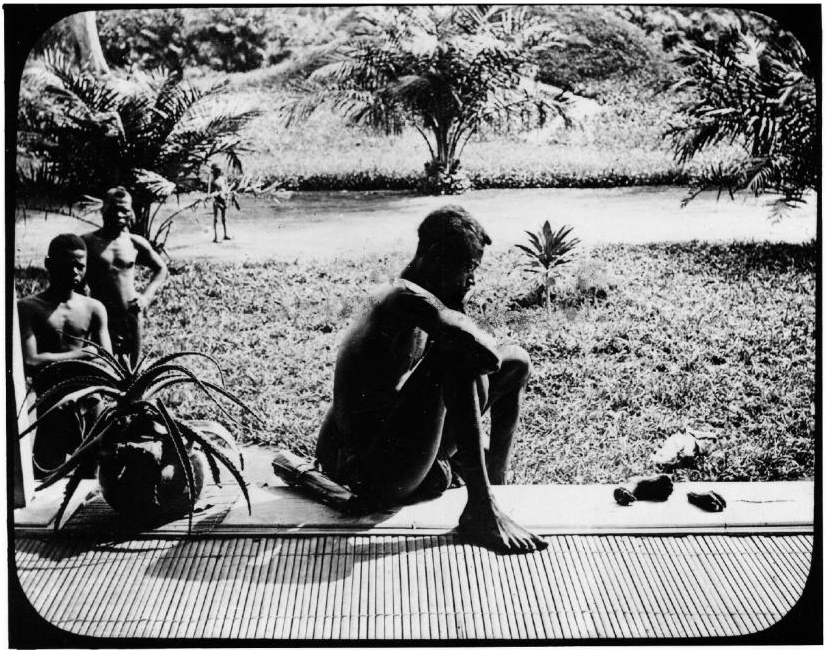
Detail of the picture from the collection of Anti-Slavery International (mirrored horizontally)

According to Nsala's statement, the guards had immediately cut up the dead before starting to cook them in pots. While they were thus busy, he had secretly picked up his daughter's hand and foot, which the guards had cut off while dismembering her, in order to use them as evidence. Upon hearing what had happened, Alice Harris was so appalled that she decided to document the scene. She asked Nsala to pose with his daughter's remains and took the photo on the veranda of the house. She used a Kodak dry plate camera for her photos. Stannard described Nsala as "dazed with grief", "horror-stricken" and "sorrowing".

Prior to their encounter with Harris and Stannard, the men had already met Raoul Van Calcken, representing Abir. Subsequent to the intervention of Harris and Stannard, he asserted that he had not been presented with the hand and foot, a claim that was at odds with the statements made by the two men from Wala.

== Subsequent investigation ==
Two days later, Bompenju and Lofiko, Nsala's brothers, visited the mission and corroborated the accounts provided by the two men from Wala regarding the incident. Botondo, a mission employee, stated that he had observed Van Calcken being shown the hand and foot. The house labourer Bokalo provided a detailed account of how the two men, who wanted to show the limbs at the mission, expressed fear before the encounter with Harris and Stannard because the "rubber white man" had ordered them not to do it.

Harris and Stannard also learned that an individual whose name has been redacted in Morel's edition of Stannard's correspondence had directed the security personnel to eliminate certain individuals. However, when he learned that the British missionaries were aware of the killings, he instructed the guards to refrain from further action. The following day, other individuals informed Stannard that some detained women had been relocated outside the Abir prison facility to prevent the British missionaries from learning about their arrest.

Stannard visited Wala between 24 and 26 May. He was informed that one of the wounded had succumbed to their injuries during his absence. He proceeded to examine the corpse and concluded that the cause of death was a bullet wound. Additionally, he discerned that the injuries sustained by the chief Elisi, whom he treated the following day, were likely caused by a bullet. Elisi provided a detailed account of how the guards from Lifinda/Lifunda initially apprehended several individuals upon their arrival. Upon inquiring with their leader, Lifumba, as to the rationale behind the attack, noting that the scheduled rubber delivery was not due for another three days, he was met with gunfire from an Albini rifle. Other sources, including the chief Mpombo, told that the killings and the cannibal meals that followed had occurred at a later point in time. According to these accounts, Boali was shot by a man called Likilo, Bondingangoa by Mboyo, and Esanga by Lomboto.

Further reports indicated that the guards had remained in Wala for one night and subsequently returned to Lifinda the following morning. On their return journey, the guards, when questioned by Bokumgu Isekolumbo regarding the rationale behind the delivery date, reportedly shot him. Several bone fragments from consumed individuals were shown to Stannard at his request. One piece was described as part of Boali's forearm, another as leg bone of a woman named Balengola.

As Stannard stated in his account, he and John Harris reported the events in question to Judge Bosco on 4 June, after the judge had requested a meeting. There Stannard signed a statement about the case.

== Further photograph five days later ==
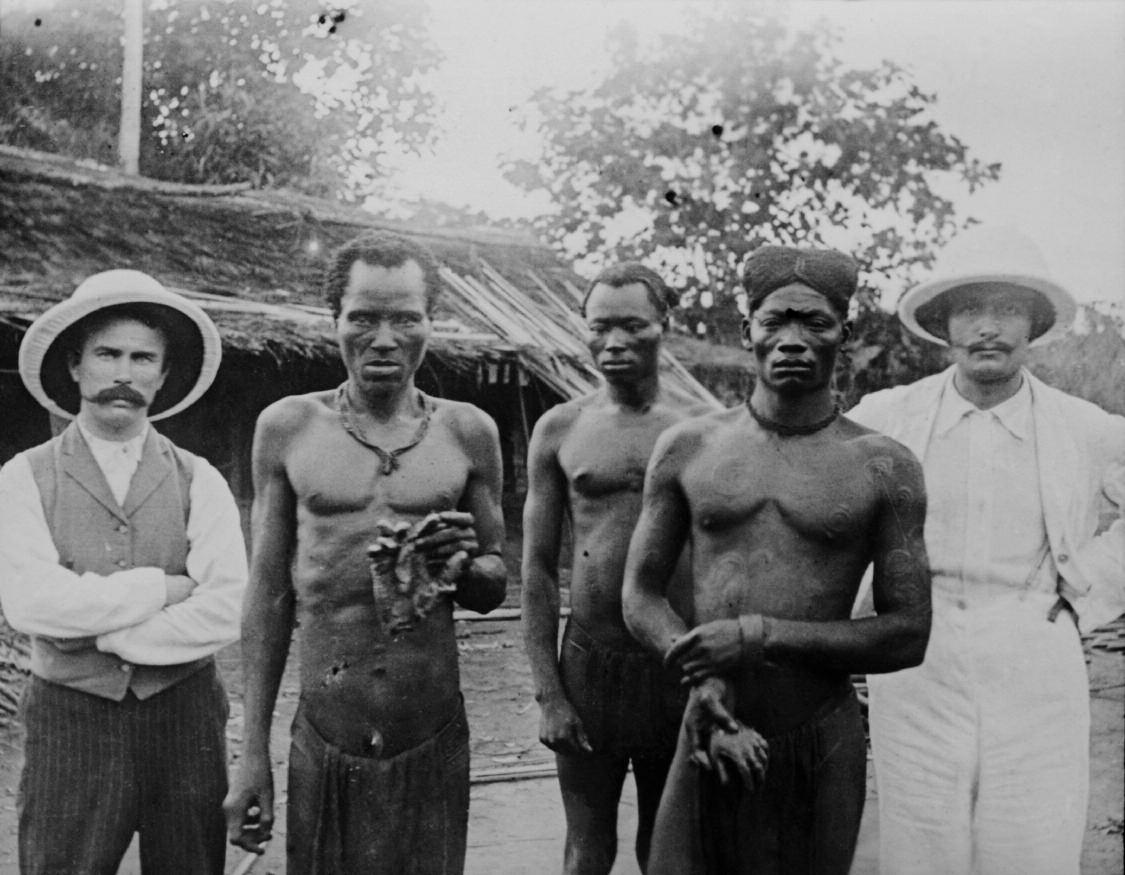
A picture taken by Alice Seely Harris five days later. It shows Bompenju and Lofiko, brothers of Nsala, as well as John Harris and Edgar Stannard, with the severed hands of Lingomo and Bolengo.

In his correspondence, Edgar Stannard also reports another testimony from Nsala's brothers and another photograph. After John Harris had returned on 19 May, Bompenju and Lofiko visited the mission again the following day with a third man and reported three more deaths. One had been eaten, and they showed the hands of the other two, Bolengo and Lingomo. Alice Harris took a photo of the three men with the hands, John Harris and Stannard. John Harris went to Van Calcken with the men. Alice Harris and Stannard spoke to other residents of Wala, who said that these killings had taken place three days earlier, with a woman, a man, and a boy as victims.

== Distribution and use of the image ==
In his letter to Guinness, dated five days after the image was made, John Harris wrote that it "is most telling, and as a slide will rouse any audience to an outburst of rage, the expression on the father's face the horror of the by-standers the mute appeal of the hand and foot will speak to the most skeptical." He added that it "might be useful to the Government". The photograph was dispatched by Alice Harris to the Marquess of Bath, who was acquainted with her father. Additionally, members of the British parliament from her father's social circle received copies of the photograph. The image was disseminated through various newspapers and periodicals. After returning to Great Britain in July 1905, the Harrises presented their transparencies in Europe and North America. These included a compilation entitled Lantern Lecture on the Congo Atrocities, which features the image under the title Nsala with his child's hand and foot.

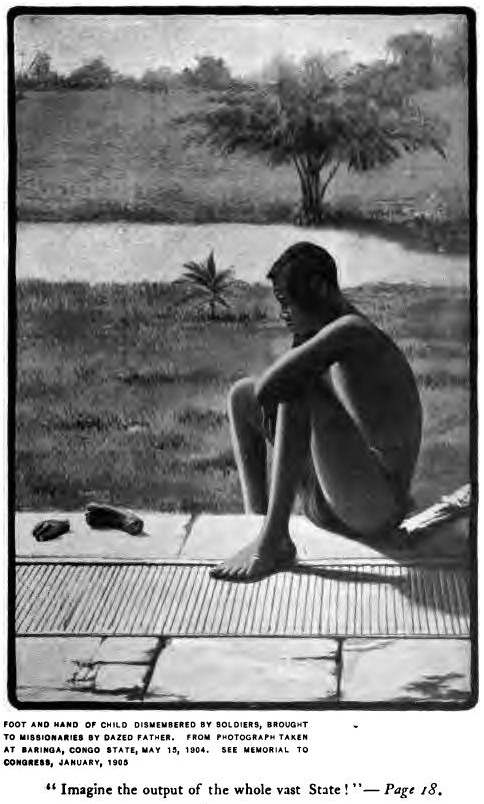
Detail of the picture published in King Leopold's Soliloquy (1905)

In his 1904 work King Leopold's Rule in Africa, Edmund Dene Morel included the picture and the letter from Stannard to Guinness which describes the circumstances surrounding its creation. Additionally, the image was reproduced in Mark Twain's 1905 satirical pamphlet, King Leopold's Soliloquy. The image was described as: "Foot and hand of child dismembered by soldiers, brought to missionaries by dazed father. From photograph taken at Baringa, Congo State, May 15, 1904."

In October 1905, Alice Harris signed a declaration stating that she had taken her pictures in good faith, following accusations of forgery against pictures taken by missionaries.

The image was reprinted in Adam Hochschild's 1998 book about the Free State, King Leopold's Ghost.

== Contemporary assessments of the image ==
Robert M. Burroughs posits that the image acts as a witness rather than resulting from the photographer's performance, because it emphasises the active involvement of Nsala. T. Jack Thompson suggests that the Harrises' images diverge from those taken by previous missionaries, who sought to contrast "European civilisation" with "African savagery" and "Christian light" with "heathen darkness".

Canadian media scholar Sharon Sliwinski describes the image as "formally posed, almost peaceful", adding:

Painful scrutiny is required to make out the items in front of Nsala. The object closest to him appears to be his daughter's foot, lying on its side, severed end tipped towards the camera; the object furthest is Boali's little hand, resting palm side down. These tiny body parts explode the peaceful composition of the image and illustrate an uncanny inversion of the typical representation of the injury: rather than picture a child with missing limbs, here Nsala poses with the remains of his missing child. Missing is not really the right word – Boali is more than simply absent from the scene – but perhaps there are no words which could appropriately describe the devastating affect of her nonexistent presence.

Wayne Morrison from the Faculty of Law at Queen Mary University describes the picture as "one of the most dramatic" that reached other countries from the Free State. Thompson describes it as "haunting". For Burroughs, it is Harris's "most famous photograph".

== See also ==
- Cannibalism in Africa § Congo Basin
- Congo Free State § Cannibalism

== Literature ==
- Burroughs, Robert M. (2011). Travel Writing and Atrocities: Eyewitness Accounts of Colonialism in the Congo, Angola, and the Putumayo. Routledge Research in Travel Writing. New York: Routledge. ISBN 978-0-415-99238-1. OCLC 436030550.
- Congo Reform Association; Belgium. Commission chargée de faire une enquête dans les territoires l'État du Congo (1905). Evidence Laid Before the Congo Commission of Inquiry at Bwembu, Bolobo, Lulanga, Baringa, Bongandanga, Ikau, Bonginda, and Monsembe. Together with a Summary of Events (and Documents Connected Therewith) on the A.B.I.R. Concession since the Commission Visited That Territory. University of California Libraries. Liverpool: J. Richardson & Sons.
- Grant, Kevin (2001). "Christian Critics of Empire: Missionaries, Lantern Lectures, and the Congo Reform Campaign in Britain". The Journal of Imperial and Commonwealth History. 29 (2): 27–58. doi:10.1080/03086530108583118. ISSN 0308-6534.
- Harms, Robert (1975). "The End of Red Rubber: A Reassessment". The Journal of African History. 16 (1): 73–88. doi:10.1017/S0021853700014110. ISSN 0021-8537. JSTOR 181099.
- Harms, Robert (1983). "The World Abir Made: The Margina-Lopori Basin, 1885–1903". African Economic History (12): 125–139. doi:10.2307/3601320. ISSN 0145-2258. JSTOR 3601320.
- Harms, Robert (2005). "King Leopold's Bonds". In Goetzmann, William Nelson; Rouwenhorst, K. Geert (eds.). The Origins of Value: The Financial Innovations That Created Modern Capital Markets. Oxford: Oxford University Press. pp. 343–357. ISBN 978-0-19-517571-4.
- Hochschild, Adam (1999). King Leopold's Ghost: A Story of Greed, Terror, and Heroism in Colonial Africa. Boston: Houghton Mifflin. ISBN 978-0-618-00190-3.
- Moncheur, Baron (1904). "Conditions in the Congo Free State". The North American Review. 179 (575): 494–503. ISSN 0029-2397. JSTOR 25105298.
- Morel, Edmund Dene (1904). King Leopold's Rule in Africa. London: W. Heinemann.
- Morrison, Wayne (2010). "A Reflected Gaze of Humanity: Cultural Criminology and Images of Genocide". In Hayward, Keith J.; Presdee, Mike (eds.). Framing Crime: Cultural Criminology and the Image. New York: Routledge. ISBN 978-0-415-45903-7.
- Sliwinski, Sharon (2006). "The Childhood of Human Rights: The Kodak on the Congo". Journal of Visual Culture. 5 (3): 333–363. doi:10.1177/1470412906070514. ISSN 1470-4129.
- Thompson, T. Jack (29 June 2007). "Capturing the Image: African Missionary Photography as Enslavement and Liberation" (PDF). Day Associates Lecture. Yale University.
- Thompson, T. Jack (2012). Light on Darkness? Missionary Photography of Africa in the Nineteenth and Early Twentieth Centuries. Studies in the History of Christian Missions. Grand Rapids, Mich.: W.B. Eerdmans. ISBN 978-0-8028-6524-3. OCLC 758244239.
- Vangroenweghe, Daniel (2010). Rood rubber: Leopold II en zijn Kongo (in Dutch). Leuven: Van Halewyck. ISBN 978-90-5617-973-1.
