= Alice Seeley Harris =

British photographer (1870–1970)

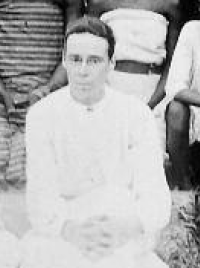
- on visit to the Belgian Congo.
- Born: Alice Seeley; 24 May 1870; Malmesbury, England, United Kingdom of Great Britain and Ireland
- Died: 24 November 1970 (aged 100); Guildford, England, United Kingdom
- Occupations: Missionary, photographer, activist
- Spouse: Sir John Harris (m. 1898; died 1940)
- Children: Alfred, Margaret, Katharine, Noel
- Parent(s): Alfred and Caroline Seeley

Alice, Lady Harris (née Seeley; 24 May 1870 – 24 November 1970) was an English missionary and an early documentary photographer. Her photography helped to expose the human rights abuses in the Congo Free State under the regime of King Leopold II of the Belgians.

== Family and origins ==
Alice Seeley was born in Malmesbury to Aldred and Caroline Seeley. Her sister, Caroline Alfreda Seeley, was a school teacher.

In 1894, she was training for the Civil Service in London and attending missionary classes where she met her future husband John Harris. Finally in 1897, after seven years of trying, Alice was accepted to go out to the Congo Free State. Shortly afterwards, Alice and John got married on 6 May 1898 at a registry office in London.

They had four children, Alfred John, Margaret Theodora, Katherine Emmerline (known as “Bay”) and Noel Lawrence.

Alice spent many years in Frome in Somerset and died at the age of 100 in 1970 at Lockner Holt in Guildford, Surrey.

== Career ==
In 1889, aged 19, Alice entered the Civil Service and was later appointed to the Accountant General's office in General Post Office, London. Alice gave her spare time to Frederick Brotherton Meyer's mission work at Regent's Park Chapel and later Christ Church, Lambeth.

Alice left the Civil Service to enter Doric Lodge, the training college of the Regions Beyond Missionary Union. Four days later, as her honeymoon, Alice sailed with John on the SS Cameroon to the Congo Free State as missionaries with the Congo-Balolo Mission. They arrived in the Congo three months later, on 4 August 1898, and then travelled to the Mission Station Ikau near Basankusu. She was appalled and saddened at what she witnessed there and began campaigning for the human rights of the Congolese natives to be recognised.

=== Campaigner ===
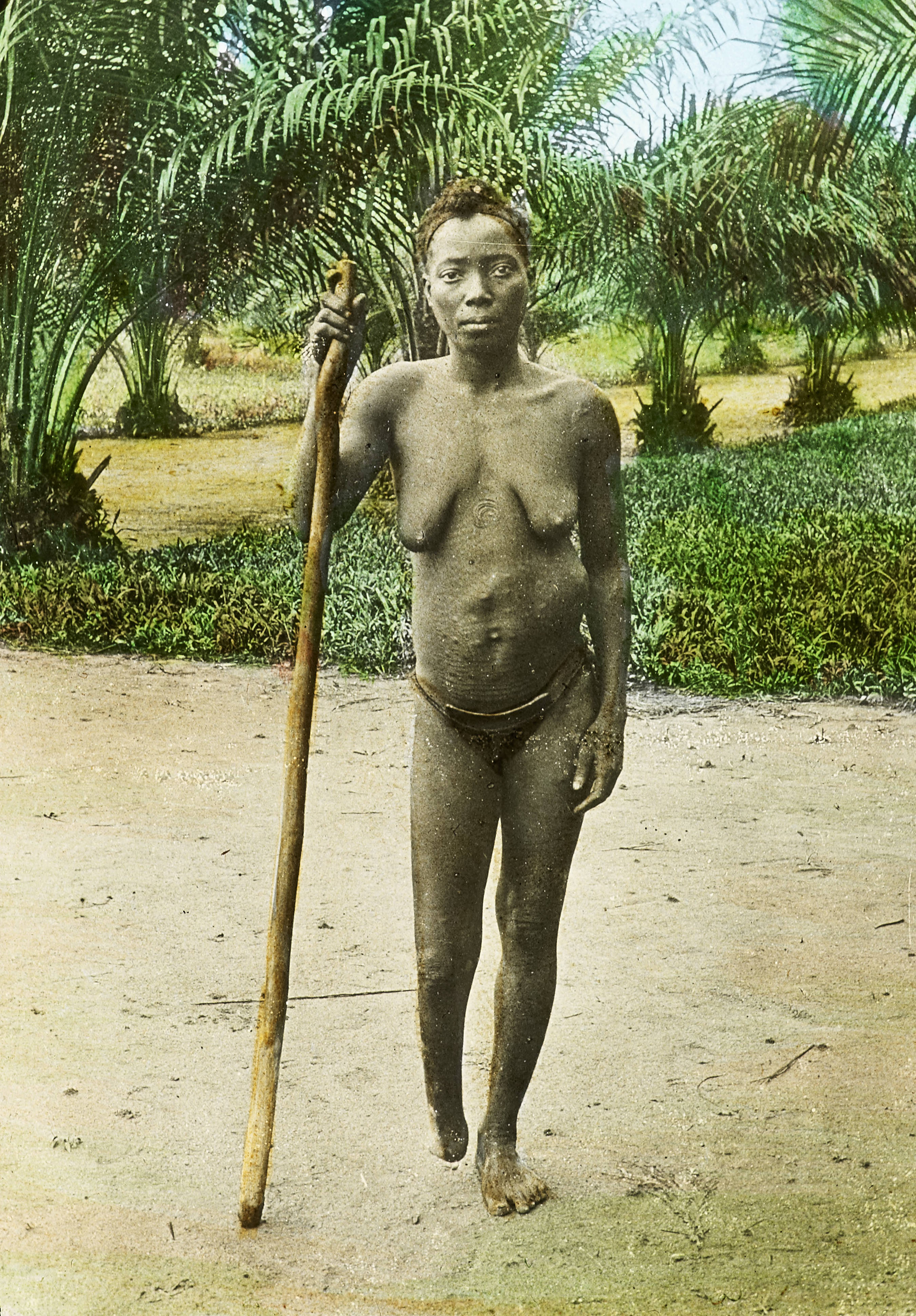
Tinted lantern slide titled "The Congo Atrocities" showing a mutilated young woman (part of a set by Alice Seeley Harris, who with her husband used these slides in magic lantern shows across the country to bring the injustices against Congolese workers to public attention)

Alice was stationed with her husband John from 1898 to 1901 at the Mission Station at Ikau, near the Lulonga River, which is a tributary of the River Congo in the Balolo Tribal region. Later, from 1901 to 1905, they were stationed at the Mission Station at Baringa, a village in Tshuapa District, Befale Territory, in what is now the Democratic Republic of the Congo. It stands on the banks of the Maringa River, approximately 100 km upriver from Basankusu.

During her time in the Congo, Alice taught literacy and Bible stories to the local children, but her most important contribution was to photograph the injuries that were sustained by the Congolese locals at the hands of the agents and soldiers of King Leopold II of Belgium. Leopold was partly exploiting the local population so fiercely to profit from increased rubber demand after the invention of the pneumatic or inflatable tyre by John Boyd Dunlop in Belfast in 1887. Methods of coercion included whipping, hostage-taking, rape, murder and burning of villages.

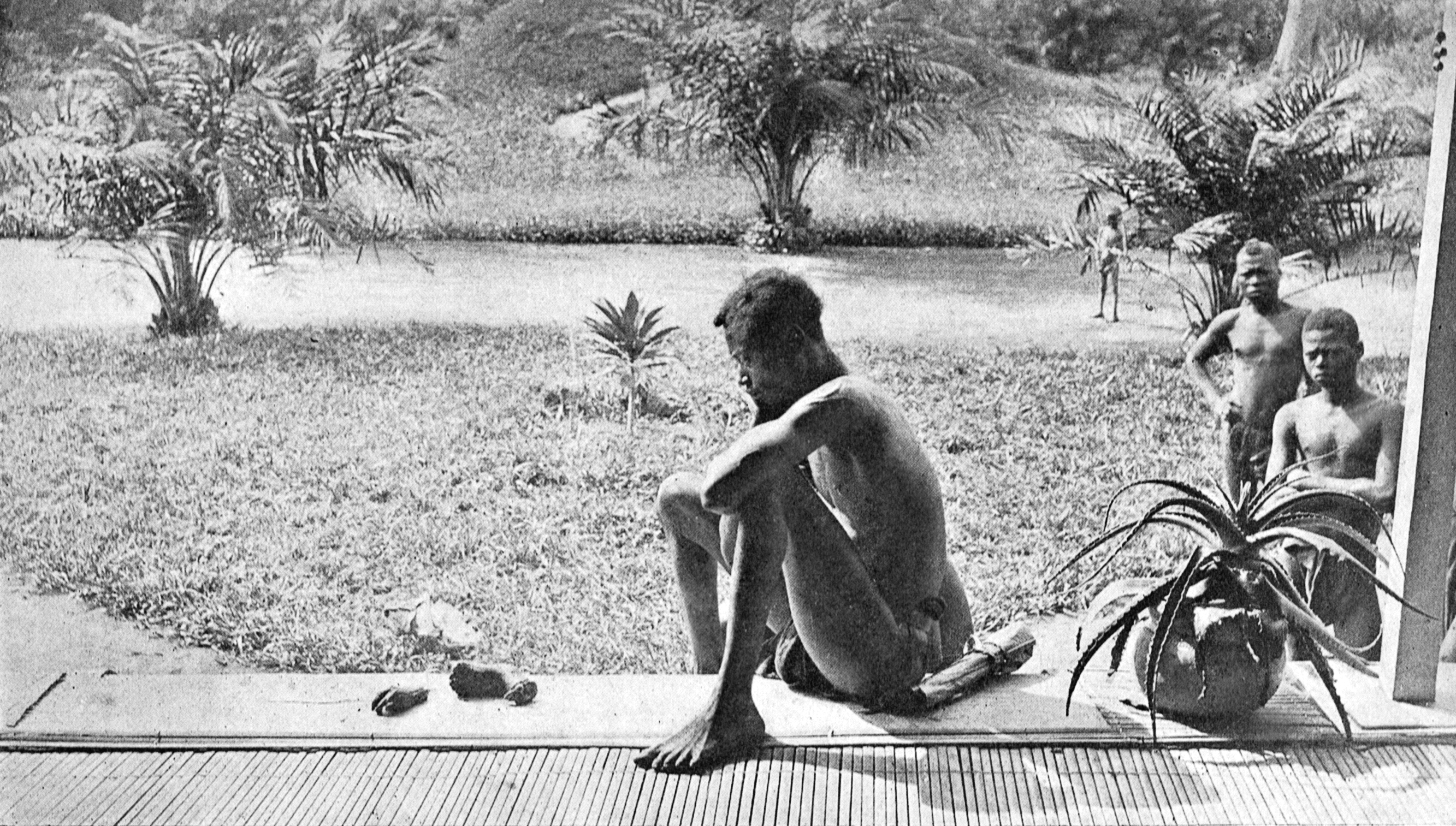
Nsala of Wala in Congo looks at the severed hand and foot of his five-year-old daughter

The most famous and shocking atrocity, whose aftermath Harris captured in her photography, was the severing of hands. In 1904, two men arrived at their mission from a village attacked by 'sentries' of the Abir Congo Company (ABIR) after failing to provide sufficient rubber. One of the men, Nsala, was holding a small bundle of leaves which when opened revealed the severed hand and foot of a child. Sentries had killed and mutilated Nsala's wife and daughter. Appalled, Alice persuaded Nsala to pose with his child's remains on the veranda of her home for a picture.

Initially, Alice's photographs were used in Regions Beyond, the magazine of the Congo Balolo Mission. In 1902, the Harrises returned to Britain temporarily. In 1904, Alice's photographs reached wider distribution including Congo Slavery, a pamphlet prepared by Mrs. H. Grattan-Guinness, wife of the editor of Regions Beyond, and in King Leopold's rule in Africa by E. D. Morel. The same year saw the founding of the Congo Reform Association by Morel.

In 1906, Alice and John Harris began working for Morel's Congo Reform Association. In early 1906, they toured the United States. John wrote that they had presented her images at 200 meetings in 49 cities via magic lantern screenings. In December 1906, the daily paper New York American used Harris's photographs to illustrate articles on atrocities in the Congo for an entire week.

In 1908, the couple became joint organizing secretaries of the Congo Reform Association and, in April 1910, they became joint organizing secretaries of the Anti-Slavery and Aborigines' Protection Society. She soon relinquished her official position, but assisted John at the Society until his death in 1940. She continued her active speaking career and was listed with Christy's Lecture Service alongside Winston Churchill and Ernest Shackleton.

In November 1908, Leopold II ceded administration of the Congo Free State to the Belgian government, thus creating the Belgian Congo. The Harrises returned to the Congo from 1911 to 1912, following the handover of the Congo to Belgium. They noted improved conditions in the treatment of natives and later produced a book, Present Conditions in the Congo, illustrated with Alice's photographs. Soon thereafter, hundreds of Alice's African documentary photographs were displayed at an exhibition at the Colonial Institution.

In 1933, she became Lady Harris when her husband was knighted, but was known for saying, "don't call me Lady!"

In 1970, she reached 100 years old and was interviewed by BBC Radio 4 on a programme called Women of Our Time.

She was the first centenarian to be a member of the Frome Society for Local Study, which has placed a plaque near where she lived in Frome.

== Legacy ==
- From 16 January to 7 March 2014, Autograph ABP in Rivington Place, London held an exhibition titled When Harmony Went to Hell - Congo Dialogues: Alice Seeley Harris and Sammy Baloji.
- From 24 January to 7 September 2014, the International Slavery Museum in Liverpool held an exhibition titled Brutal Exposure: the Congo centred on Alice's photographs.
- In 2017 a plaque was unveiled at Merchants Barton, Frome, in remembrance of Seeley's life and work. The plaque reads, "Alice Seeley, Lady Harris Anti-slavery campaigner, photographer, missionary to the Congo, artist, scourge of King Leopold II of the Belgians, lived at 3 Merchants Barton 1882 – 1888 Born Malmesbury 24 May 1870. Died Guildford 24 November 1970".

== See also ==
- Atrocities in the Congo Free State
- Congo Free State propaganda war
- Documentary photography
- New Woman
