= Abir Congo Company =

Rubber company in the Congo Free State

Anglo-Belgian India Rubber Company
- Logo used under the name Compagnie Du Congo Belge

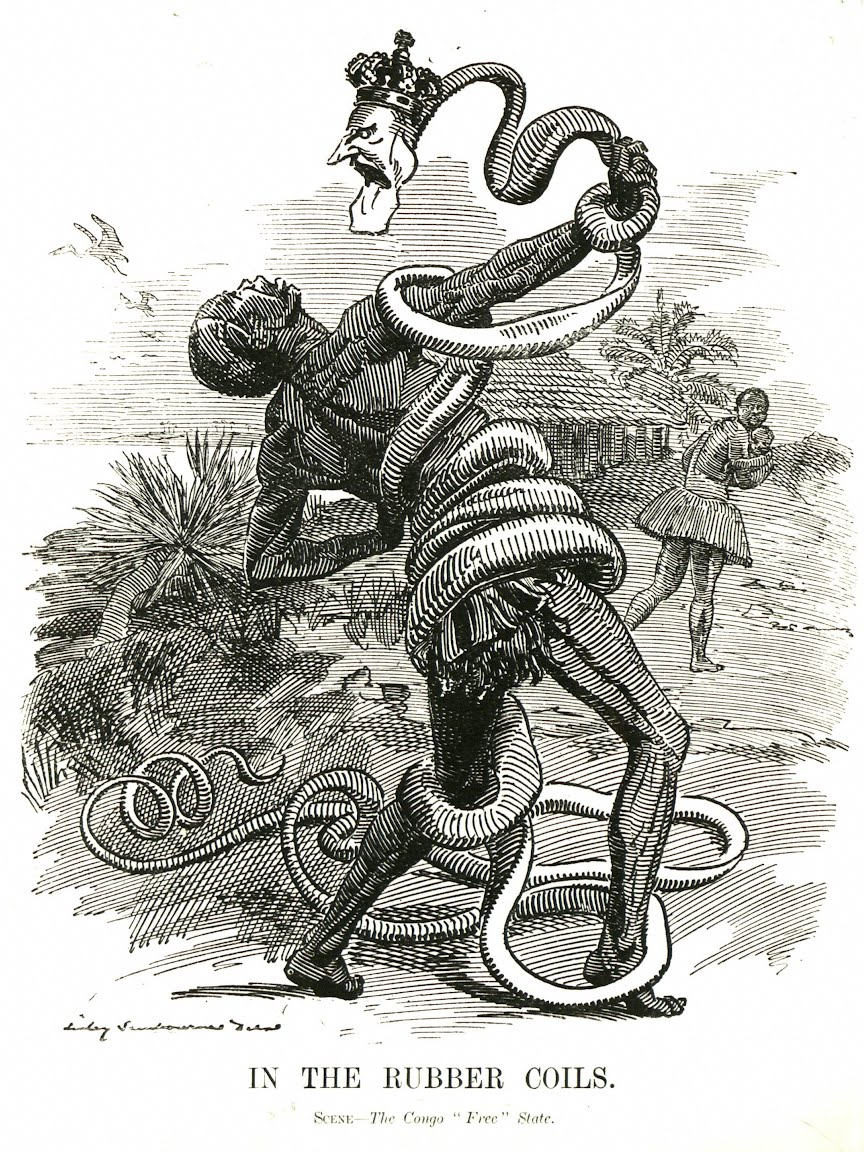
- In the rubber coils – a Punch cartoon depicting Leopold II as a rubber vine entangling a Congolese rubber collector
- Type: Joint-stock company
- Industry: Rubber extraction and manufacturing
- Founded: August 6, 1892; 133 years ago in Antwerp, Belgium
- Founders: John Thomas North; Leopold II
- Defunct: 1926
- Fate: Unknown
- Successor: Maringa company
- Headquarters: Basankusu, Congo Free State
- Products: Rubber
- Number of employees: 47,000 (1906)

The Abir Congo Company (founded as the Anglo-Belgian India Rubber Company and later known as the Compagnie du Congo Belge) was a company that exploited natural rubber in the Congo Free State, the private property of King Leopold II of Belgium. The company was founded with British and Belgian capital and was based in Belgium. By 1898 there were no longer any British shareholders and the Anglo-Belgian India Rubber Company changed its name to the Abir Congo Company and changed its residence for tax purposes to the Free State. The company was granted a large concession in the north of the country and the rights to tax the inhabitants. This tax was taken in the form of rubber obtained from a relatively rare rubber vine. The collection system revolved around a series of trade posts along the two main rivers in the concession. Each post was commanded by a European agent and manned with armed sentries to enforce taxation and punish any rebels.

Abir enjoyed a boom through the late 1890s, by selling a kilogram of rubber in Europe for up to 10 fr which had cost them just 1.35 fr. However, this came at a cost to the human rights of those who could not pay the tax with imprisonment, flogging and other corporal punishment recorded. Abir's failure to suppress destructive harvesting methods and to maintain rubber plantations meant that the vines became increasingly scarce and by 1904 profits began to fall. During the early 1900s famine and disease spread across the concession, a natural disaster judged by some to have been exacerbated by Abir's operations, further hindering rubber collection. The 1900s also saw widespread rebellions against Abir's rule in the concession and attempts at mass migration to the French Congo or southwards. These events typically resulted in Abir dispatching an armed force to restore order.

A series of reports into the operation of the Free State were issued starting with the British Consul, Roger Casement's Casement Report and followed by reports commissioned by the Free State and Leopold II. These detailed unlawful killings and other abuses made by Abir and Leopold II was embarrassed into instituting reforms. These began with the appointment of American Richard Mohun by Leopold II as director of Abir. However, rubber exports continued to fall and rebellions increased, resulting in the Free State assuming control of the concession in 1906. Abir continued to receive a portion of profits from rubber exports and in 1911 was refounded as a rubber plantation harvesting company: the Compagnie du Congo Belge. The later history of the company is unknown but it was still active in 1939.

== Origins ==
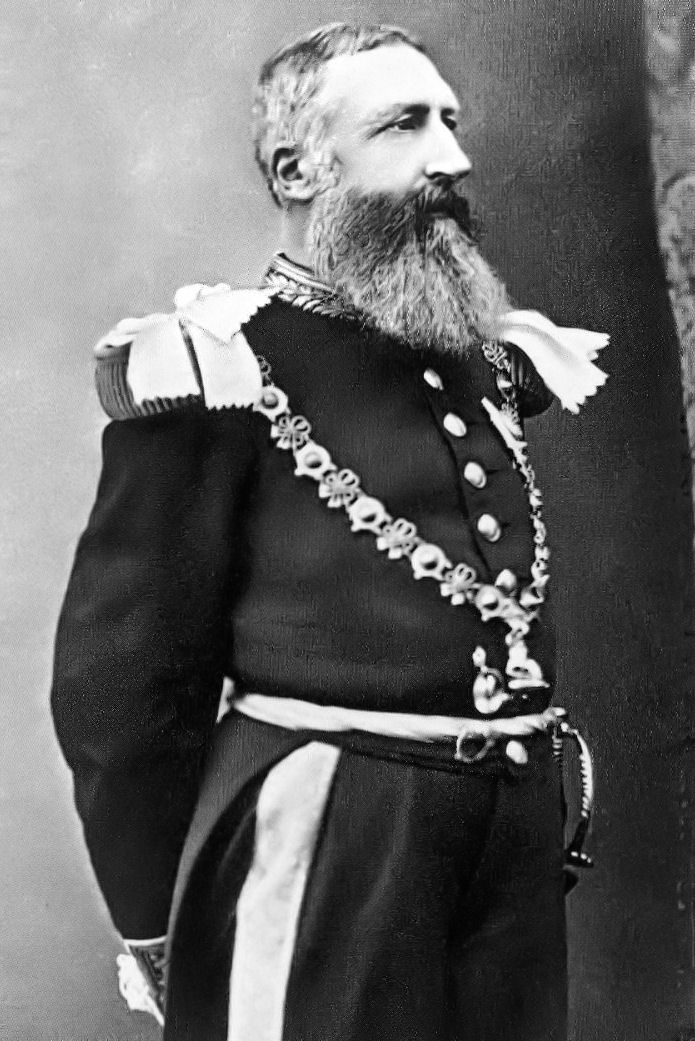
Leopold II of the Belgians

The Congo Free State was a corporate state in Central Africa privately owned by King Leopold II of Belgium founded and recognised by the Berlin Conference of 1885. What would later become Abir Company territory was the land between the Lopori and Maringa river basins, tributaries of the Congo River, in the north of the state. The local populace here were yam and cassava farmers who engaged in trade with river fishermen and pygmy hunters. In 1885 a force of the Manyema people, followers of Tippu Tip, the Swahili-Zanzibari slave trader, arrived at the head of the Lopori River from Stanley Falls. They took hostages from nearby villages to ransom in return for ivory. By 1892 they had enrolled local people into their army and controlled the entire eastern half of the basin. The Free State was concerned by this development and in 1889 had enacted the Monopoly Act which declared that all products in the area were to be under their jurisdiction alone. The Free State also began a campaign to drive the slavers, traders and the Manyema from the region, the first stage of which was the establishment of a supply post at Basankusu in May 1890. The campaign would be long but eventually successful and the entire basin was under Free State control by 1898.

The Free State began using its new-found control of the region to levy taxes from the local population, gathered using similar hostage tactics to the Manyema. The taxes were initially collected in the form of ivory but when ivory supplies began to run low the Free State switched to natural rubber. The rubber was collected from Landolphia owariensis gentilii rubber vines which were relatively scarce in the area with an average frequency of around one plant in each acre. The rubber was gathered by tapping a rubber vine and placing a pot beneath to collect the latex which could be used in the production of rubber for the European market. If the vines were a long distance from the ground the gatherer would have had to climb a tree, tap the plant and hold the collecting pot beneath the vine, possibly for an entire day. Hence rubber collection was a labour-intensive process which made it unpopular with the villagers. Indeed, they preferred the Manyema to the Free State authorities as the Manyema only took low bulk, high value items such as ivory or slaves because of the long distances from their homeland whereas the state, with its steamboat transports, could afford to make the people harvest the low value high bulk rubber. By September 1892 the Free State was using its military forces to attack and occupy villages in the Lulonga and Maringa river valleys to expand its tax base.

== Establishment ==
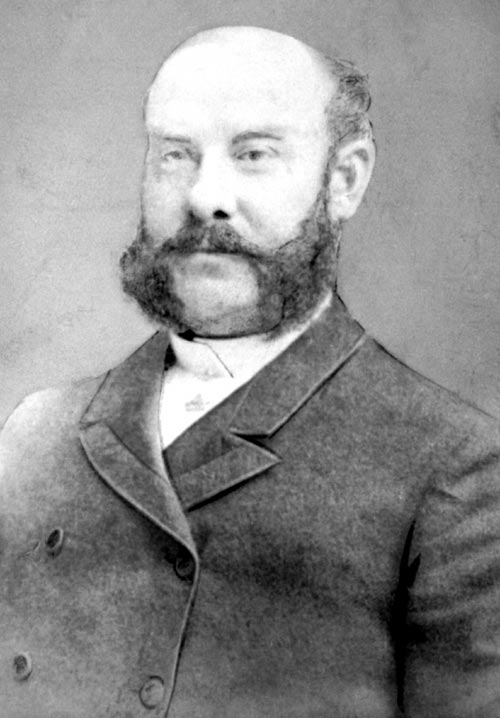
John Thomas North

King Leopold decided to give concessions of his territory to private companies who would then collect the rubber tax and export it. With this in mind he approached British Colonel John Thomas North, who had made a fortune through speculating on Chilean nitrates, for capital with which to fund a concession company. North agreed and provided £40,000 of the 250,000 Belgian francs' (fr) initial investment. As a result, the Anglo-Belgian India Rubber Company (informally known as Abir) was established at Antwerp on 6 August 1892. The company was divided into 2,000 shares of 500 fr value each. British investors (including North) held 1880 shares whilst Belgians held the remaining 120 shares. In addition to the 2,000 ordinary shares there were 2,000 "actions" which entitled the holder to a share of the profits after a 6% dividend was paid to the shareholders. The Congo Free State was the holder of 1,000 of these actions. In return Abir received exclusive rights to all forest products from the Maringa-Lopori basin for 30 years and all land within twenty miles of eight designated posts and had police powers within the limits of the concession. The Free State also had to supply guns, ammunition and soldiers to help establish the posts. In preparation two State employees were ordered to establish a headquarters for Abir at Basankusu but this was barely begun before the local villagers rebelled against State rule and killed both men.

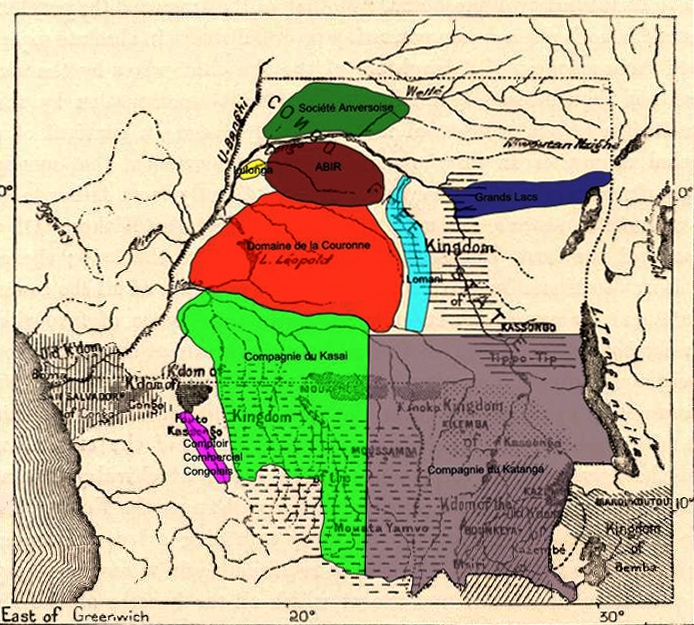
Congo Free State concession companies, Abir shown in dark red

The concession provided to Abir lay in the north of the country and was one of nine commercial concession areas established by Leopold in the Congo Free State. The concession was bounded to the north by the Congo River and the Société Anversoise concession, to the east by the Lomami River and the Lomami Company concession and to the west by the Lulonga Company concession which straddled the Lulonga River, into which the Maringa and Lopori flowed. To the south lay the Crown Domain (Domaine de la Couronne), the private property of Leopold, which comprised the best land in the Free State and was the richest in rubber.

The Abir concession included the Bolombo river, Yekokora river and Lomako river which were tributaries of the two main rivers. Each concession operated independently and exploited its own area commercially. The other main rubber companies in the Congo Free State were the Société Anversoise and the Lulonga Company but Abir was the largest in the country.

Abir re-established their headquarters at Basankusu in 1893 and its position at the confluence of the Maringa and Lopori allowed Abir to expand along the rivers and their tributaries, establishing new posts along the way. Progress was slow as the Free State's activities had made the population in the west hostile to colonisation and the east remained in the control of the Manyema and the Zanzibari slavers. The company's first post on the Lopori River had to be relocated because of threats from locals and rubber collection at Befori began only after a series of bloody conflicts between the villagers and Abir's men.

== Post system ==
Abir company posts within the concession

The post system was the cornerstone of Abir's commercial activity. Each post was run by one or two European agents to oversee local operations. The salary for an agent was 1,800 fr per year, sometimes increasing to 2,100 fr in the second year, and the standard contract period was three years. Agents also received 60 fr of trade goods each month with which to buy their food. Despite the low wages the 2% commission that each agent received on rubber production made up the majority of the agents' pay, for example the agent at Bongandanga received 16,800 fr in commission in 1903. As a result, there were many applicants for each post and agents were hired with the expectation that they would increase production by 0.5–3 tons per month. This was implemented by extending the post to include more villages or increasing the quotas expected from the villagers, often indirectly forcing women and children to harvest the rubber as well. If production fell below the quota agents made up the shortfall in lost profits to the company from their pay. Each post consisted of a residence for the agent, barracks for armed sentries and sheds for rubber drying and storage, all built using labour conscripted from the villagers. A typical post employed ten African workmen to sort and dry the rubber, seven servants for the agent and thirty canoemen for local river transport. These were paid around 36.5 fr per year in goods, commonly 5 kg of salt, one blanket, five machetes and trade goods to the value of 6.35 fr. The post system was managed by the Director of Congo Operations at the central office in Basankusu. He was assisted in his job of keeping production up and expenses down by the only Free State employee in the concession, the commander of the police. The police commander was in charge of suppressing revolts and punishing villages which dropped below the quota. He had access to a large force of men and river steamers which were stationed at Basankusu and could redeploy quickly to the site of large scale rebellions. Effective police commanders would receive bonuses paid for by Abir.

Each post maintained a census of all the males from the nearby villages to implement the tax which was initially set at 4 kg of dry rubber (8 kg of wet rubber) per man per fortnight. Each post had a force of 65–100 "village sentries", often ex-slaves armed with muzzle loading rifles, which resided in the villages to enforce taxation. The sentries were kept at the expense of the villagers and often used flogging, imprisonment or execution to keep production up. Sentries who failed to enforce the quota or made mistakes could be fined up to half their salary or fired, imprisoned or flogged. In addition to the village sentries were "post sentries" who were 25–80 men armed with modern, breech-loading Albini rifles who lived on the post and were used to punish villages and suppress rebellions. Sentries were paid similar wages to the post workmen and despite the strict working conditions it was a popular job as it offered a position of power over the other villagers. The sentries had their choice of food, women and luxury items and many left after a one-year term with five or six wives which they then sold.

To comply with Congo law the company had to pay the villagers for bringing them rubber, these payments were often made in goods. Roger Casement, the British Consul in the Free State, recorded payments of a nine-inch knife of 1.25 fr value for a full basket of rubber, a five-inch knife worth 0.75 fr for a less full basket and beads worth 0.25 fr for a smaller amount of rubber. Yet the main incentive for villagers to bring rubber was not the small payments but the fear of punishment. If a man did not fulfil his quota his family may have been taken hostage by Abir and released only when the quota was filled. The man himself was not imprisoned as that would prevent him from collecting rubber. Later agents would simply imprison the chief of any village which fell behind its quota, in July 1902 one post recorded that it held 44 chiefs in prison. These prisons were in a poor condition and the posts at Bongandanga and Mompono recorded death rates of three to ten prisoners per day each in 1899. Those with records of resisting the company were deported to forced labour camps. There were at least three of these camps, one at Lireko, one on the Upper Maringa River and one on the Upper Lopori River. In addition to imprisonment corporal punishment was also used against tax resisters with floggings of up to 200 lashes with a chicotte, a hippopotamus hide whip, being reported. Some agents would tie men to platforms facing the sun or burn them with gum from the copal tree as a means of punishment.

== Boom and refounding ==
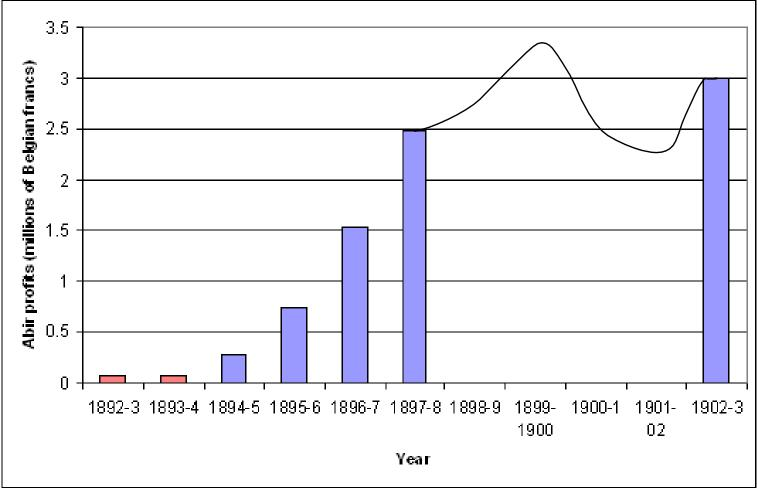
Abir profits 1892–1903, the line shows the general trend for missing data

Abir collected 70 tons of dried rubber in 1895, rising to 410 tons in 1898 by which time it had eleven operational posts. At the same time the price of rubber also increased from 6.30 to 6.50 fr per kilogram in 1894 to 8.04–10.00 fr per kilogram in 1898. Abir's costs in 1897 amounted to 0.25 fr per kilogram to purchase the rubber from the collectors (in lieu of tax), 0.4 fr for transportation, 0.25 in export duty paid to the Congo Free State and 0.45 for storage for a total cost of 1.35 fr per kilogram. In the same year Abir could sell on the rubber in Europe for up to 10 fr per kilogram. Abir's profits rose with the increasing quantity and price of rubber, for the first two years (1892–94) the company recorded a total profit of 131,340 fr, this had increased almost twentyfold by 1898 when they recorded a 2,482,697 fr profit just for one year. As a result, the dividend paid in 1898 was 1,100 fr per 500 fr share. These profits were made in spite of increasing costs due to the doubling of export duty in 1892 and the construction of the Leopoldville-Matadi railway in 1894 which increased the cost of moving rubber to the coast to 0.63 fr per kilo, more than the entire trip to Antwerp had taken in 1892.

The Abir Company entered liquidation in 1898 as a means of tax avoidance and to escape Belgian business regulations. It was immediately refounded in the Congo Free State as the Abir Congo Company. The name was no longer an acronym of Anglo-Belgian India Rubber and was instead a name in its own right. This change was because the company was no longer supported by British investment, partly because Colonel North had died and his heirs had sold their shares. The new company had a simpler shares system with just 2,000 shares (of 14,300 fr value each) divided between investors. The Free State held 1,000 of these shares. As Abir was now tax resident in the Congo the Free State received 2% of their profits through corporation tax, in addition to the 0.5 fr per kilogram export tax. All initial capital investments had been amortised by 1899 along with material expenses in Africa and property and equipment expenses in Antwerp. In 1900 Abir reached the boundaries of its concession which covered eight million hectares. The next three years were spent filling gaps between existing posts and by 1903 Abir controlled 49 posts, managed by 58 agents. 1900 was Abir's most profitable year and the Congo Free State's shares and taxes provided 2,567,880.50 fr of revenue for the state, 10% of that year's total. The share dividend in 1900 was 2,100 fr, in the early 1890s it had been around 2 fr per share.

== Decline and abuse of power ==
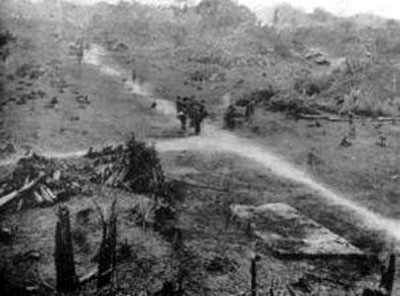
Clearing a village at Baringa to make way for a plantation

The rubber vine could be destructively harvested by cutting up the vine and squeezing out the latex whilst it lay on the ground. This was quicker and easier than non-destructive harvesting and was practised by villagers who wished to fill their quotas and avoid punishment, especially once supplies of the vine began to run low. In addition some vines were destroyed deliberately by villagers who believed that once the rubber was gone Abir would leave the concession. Because of this destruction all rubber vines within 10 km of Basankasu were depleted within 18 months of that post opening. In an attempt to slow the destruction of vines Abir issued orders in 1892 and 1904 which prohibited destructive harvesting methods but these were largely ineffective. In 1896 the Congo Free State ordered Abir to plant 150 rubber trees or vines for each ton of rubber exported to replace destructively harvested vines. This was increased to 500 plants per ton in 1902. By 1903 the plantation at the Bongandanga post held more than one million plants and by 1904 each Abir post employed around one hundred workers to manage its plantation. Despite this the plantation project was ultimately a failure due in part to the fact that each Abir agent remained at a post for just two years and was uninterested in working the plantation which would only benefit his successor. Congo Free State forestry officers also noted that Abir plantations were smaller than required or even existed only on paper. Abir would also plant vines which looked similar to the Landolphia vine but did not produce rubber, as a consequence the Free State required them to instead plant the Clitandra vine which was more easily recognisable but did not produce rubber in its first eight years. These vines may never have reached maturity as there is no evidence that these plantations ever produced rubber. In 1904 Abir began to run out of vines to tap and rubber production fell to half of that of 1903, which was 1000 tons. By 1904 rubber vines within 50 miles of Abir posts had been depleting, leading to violent clashes between rival villages over control of the remaining plants. The entirety of the Lulonga concession, to the west of Abir, produced just 7 tons of rubber in 1905.

The presence of Abir in the area exacerbated the effect of natural disasters such as famine and disease. Abir's tax collection system forced men out from the villages to collect rubber which meant that there was no labour available to clear new fields for planting. This in turn meant that the women had to continue to plant worn-out fields resulting in lower yields, a problem aggravated by Abir sentries stealing crops and farm animals. The post at Bonginda experienced a famine in 1899 and in 1900 missionaries recorded a "terrible famine" across the Abir region. The modern descendants of Abir's villagers refer to the period of company control as "Lonkali", the period of famine. Disease was also a problem with smallpox moving in from the east being reported in the Upper Lopori in 1893 and reaching Bongandanga in 1901. A concurrent smallpox epidemic moving from the west destroyed villages along the Lulonga in 1899, and reached Basankusu in 1902. Sleeping sickness was also reported around the Lulonga by 1900 and spread up the Maringa and Lopori. Despite the arrival of these deadly diseases the main killers in the area were lung and intestinal diseases which killed twenty times as many people as smallpox and sleeping sickness combined. At least one missionary attributed the rise of disease with rubber collecting.

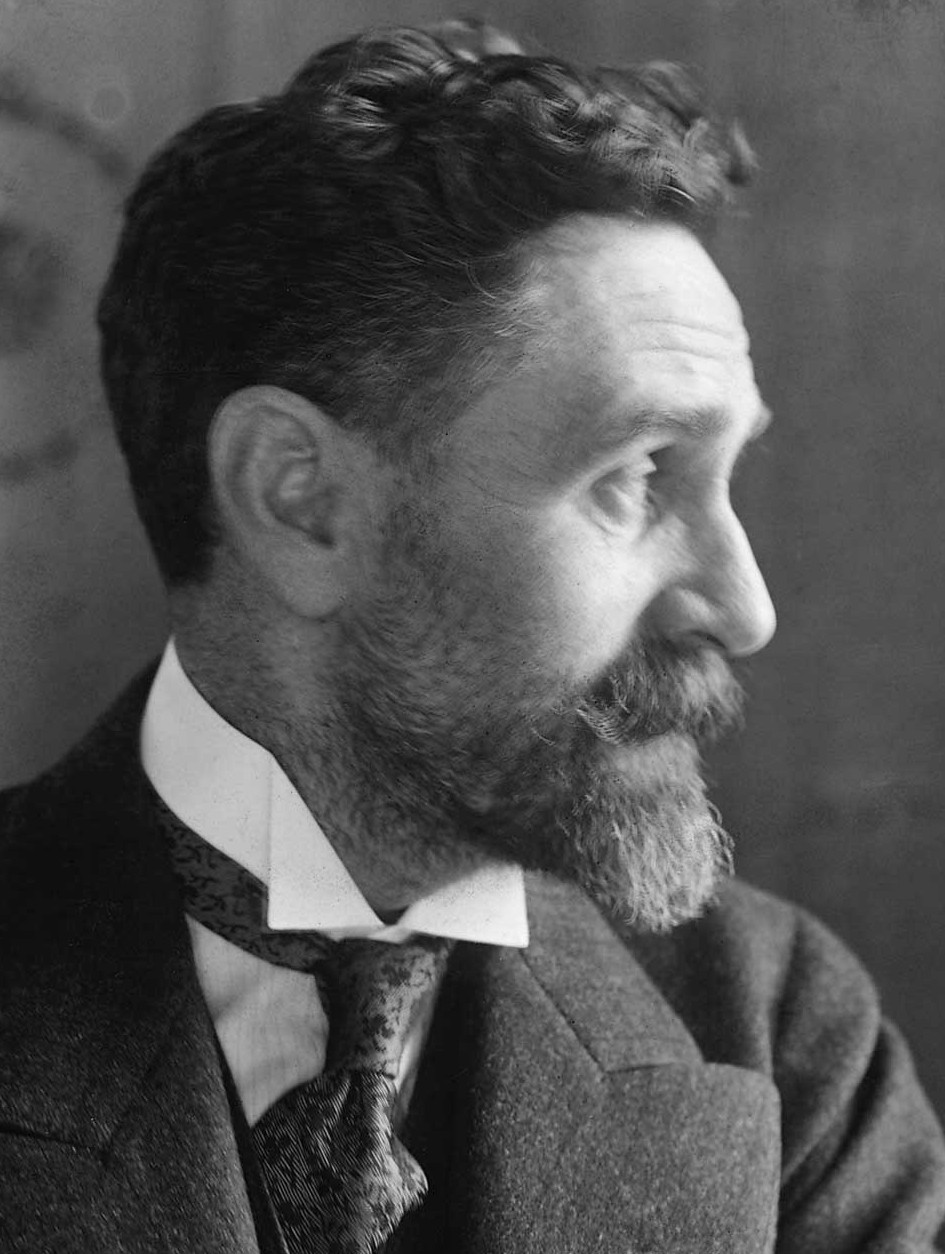
Roger Casement, author of the Casement Report

Abuses of power over the villagers by Abir had been reported by missionaries almost since they began operations in the Congo but the first real public disclosure came in 1901 with the publication of a report, written by an ex-agent, in several Belgian newspapers. The Free State began an investigation into Abir's abuses during which an inquiry established at Bongandanga heard evidence from missionaries in the concession. As a result, Abir took action against the missionaries, stopping the carriage of their mail on company steamers, stopping the missionaries' boats and confiscating any mail that they carried. Abir also forbade missionaries from buying food from villagers, forcing them to buy from Abir's own stores. In 1904 Roger Casement issued the Casement Report which condemned the Abir system; this resulted in the Free State launching another investigation later that year. Although evidence of unlawful killings made by Abir was uncovered the investigation had no powers of arrest and could only submit a report to the Free State authorities. This lack of action resulted in deteriorating relations between Abir and the missionaries and there was at least one attempted shooting of a missionary. Evidence for Abir's abuses also came from the governor of the French Congo, to the north-west, who claimed that prior to 1903 30,000 people had been driven from the Free State to the French Congo by Abir's actions.

It is also known that Abir had been forced to put down rebellions of the Yamongo, Boonde, Bofongi, Lilangi, Bokenda, Pukaonga and Kailangi peoples around the turn of the century and that five Abir sentries had been killed near Bongandanga in 1901 and 1902. The Boangi and Likeli peoples were forcibly resettled closer to the post at Bosow and in 1903 Abir troops intervened to stop the emigration of the Lika people and villagers near Samba. To stop small-scale emigration Abir instigated a permit system for people wishing to visit another village. At the Momponi post the Abir agent led a punitive expedition against the Seketulu tribe which resulted in 400 civilian deaths with hundreds captured and put in prison, where a further 100 died. When the Nsongo Mboyo tribe attempted to emigrate 1,000 were captured and sent to a forced labour camp. The Likongo, Lianja, Nkole, Yan a-Yanju, Nongo-Ingoli, and Lofoma people all successfully fled toward Tshuapa. Despite this chaos Abir managed to increase its exports for 1903 to 951 tons recording the second highest profit in its history. However, this partial recovery did not last long and soon profits were falling once more.

== Attempts at reform ==
Leopold was embarrassed by complaints made by the British government about human rights abuses in the Congo Free State and dispatched a Commission of Inquiry to investigate the entirety of the Congo. This commission visited the Abir concession from 1 December 1904 to 5 January 1905 and, despite Abir's attempts to keep witnesses away, heard evidence of violence committed by Abir. This included the desolation of villages, murder, rape, hostage taking and excessive flogging. Abir was the only commercial body mentioned by name in the report for brutality which said that the concession was "the black spot on the history of Central African settlement". The commission instigated limited reforms, laying down new interpretations of existing legislation which included a limit of 40 working hours per week for collectors, the option of paying taxes in commodities other than rubber and the removal of sentries from the villages. Two months after this Leopold sent a Royal High Commissioner to Abir to check that the reforms were being carried out, he was told that Abir had no intention of instituting any reforms. The commissioner established two deputy public prosecutors in the Abir concession but one investigated only missionaries and the second brought few cases against Abir men.

One important result of the Congo Commission of Inquiry was that it spurred Leopold into carrying out reforms. One of the first stages of these reforms was Leopold's appointment of Richard Dorsey Mohun, an American explorer and soldier of fortune, as director of Abir. Mohun held a keen interest in the eradication of the slave trade and had worked for the US and Belgian governments, with his duties including the suppression of cannibalism and slavery in the Free State. He was given extensive executive powers and placed in a position of "unusual opportunity for the correction of past abuses".

Despite this Abir's problems increased, the company reported an increase in rebellions against its rule and 142 of its sentries were killed or wounded during the first half of 1905. An uprising at the post of Baringa resulted in the spearing of several sentries and the cutting off of food supplies to the Abir post. Abir's military forces proved insufficient to restore control throughout the spring and summer of 1905 and they were forced to call in state troops. Three European officers and their Free State troops toured the area threatening villages with recriminations if rubber was not harvested, but despite this the post recorded absolutely no harvest for 1905 to 1906. A similar event occurred at Mompono where around half of the population fled the area, those that remained being forcibly relocated closer to the Abir post. The agent at Bongandanga tried to prevent a rebellion by reducing rubber collection from once per fortnight to once every three weeks. This was only temporarily successful and an Abir outpost was later burned down. The company, unwilling to admit falls in rubber plant stocks, publicly stated that the rebellions were fomented by missionaries.

When Viscount Mountmorres visited the concession in 1905 he reported abandoned villages across the territory and that villagers had fled to the deepest parts of the forest to avoid Abir's taxes. These villagers were living in makeshift leaf shelters and with few comforts. By March 1906 Richard Mohun, Abir's director, admitted that the situation in the area was out of control and suggested that the Congo Free State should assume control of the concession. By September of that year Abir was unable to contain the increasing number of rebellions and, facing falling profits, was forced to completely withdraw from the area and hand control of the concession back to the Free State. At this point there were still 47,000 rubber collectors listed on the company's books. The other two major rubber companies in the Congo, the Société Anversoise and the Lulonga Company, also had their concessions taken back into state control in 1906.

== Free State takeover and legacy ==
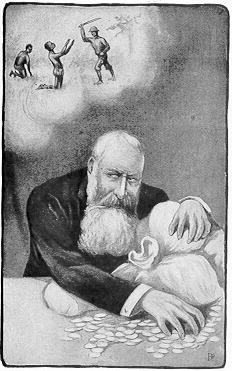
1905 cartoon of Leopold II with his private earnings from the Congo Free State

The Free State was happy to take over Abir's concession as the State had built up sufficient income to be able to afford to run tax collections by itself. In addition the Free State was embarrassed by the continuing allegations of atrocities caused by Abir and it could institute reforms more effectively if it were in control. Leopold authorised the takeover in the hope that the Free State would be able to resume rubber collection and exports and on 12 September 1906 an agreement was signed which stated that all profits from the concession would go to the Free State in return for payment to Abir of 4.5 fr per kilogram of rubber harvested until 1952. Leopold told Abir's shareholders that he expected exports to return to normal levels within two years. To restore control the Free State dispatched a force of 650 men and 12 European officers under the command of Inspector Gerard to the concession. They returned four months later, leaving some areas still rebellious and with news that there were almost no rubber plants left. As a result, the quotas expected per man were cut to just 6 kg of rubber per year, with some struggling to find even that much. State income was therefore negligible whilst the costs of controlling the concession continued to increase. Throughout this time Abir was still making a profit by taking its share of the rubber exported for almost no expenditure.

By 1901 there were so few rubber plants left in the concession that the Free State authorities granted permission for the villagers to cut down the remaining plants and grind their bark to retrieve the rubber. Once this process was completed the rubber tax was abolished. The Abir company merged with the Société Anversoise in May 1911 to form the Compagnie du Congo Belge and now focussed on the management of rubber plantations and the gathering of rubber from them. However, later that year it agreed with the Belgian government to reduce the size of its operations and its monopoly status. In July 1911 it was banned from collecting rubber within the confines of its old concession for 18 months and was subject to new laws introduced by the Free State. The later history of the company is unknown but it continued to operate until at least 1926 when it split off its oil palm concessions into the Maringa company.

Abir's rubber gathering practices made it the most notorious of all the concession companies for human rights abuses in the Congo Free State. Abir was only involved with primary resource gathering and, despite being owned by European industrialists, operated in a style similar to warlords such as Tippu Tip. Abir was supported in its operations by the Free State which required the enormous profits generated to strengthen its control over the country during its formative years. The concession companies gave the Free State the time and revenue required to secure the Congo and to plan a long-term and more stable program of colonisation. Abir ultimately failed as its harvesting process valued high production over sustainability and it doomed to live out its own boom and bust cycle. Despite this the Abir production model was used by the French government as the basis for its concession system in the French Congo.

== See also ==
- Congo-Balolo Mission
- Belgian colonisation in Africa
- Nsala of Wala in the Nsongo District
