= Yekokora River =

River in the Democratic Republic of the Congo

Location of the Yekokora River

The Yekokora River is a river in Équateur province, Democratic Republic of the Congo. The Yekokora is a tributary of the Lopori River. The Lopori River joins with the Maringa River to the south, to form the Lulonga River, a tributary of the Congo River. The Yekokora flows through the Lopori / Maringa basin, also known as the Maringa-Lopori-Wamba forest Landscape, an area of great ecological importance.
