= Lomako River =

River in Democratic Republic of the Congo

Coordinates: 0.87737°N 20.76835°E

Location of the Lomako River

The Lomako River is a river in Équateur province, Democratic Republic of the Congo. The Lomako is a tributary of the Maringa River. The Maringa River joins with the Lopori River to the north, to form the Lulonga River, a tributary of the Congo River. The Lomako flows through the Lopori / Maringa basin, also known as the Maringa-Lopori-Wamba Landscape, an area of great ecological importance.
