= Bolombo River =

River in Democratic Republic of the Congo

Location of the Bolombo River

The Bolombo River is a river in Équateur province, Democratic Republic of the Congo. The Bolombo is a tributary of the Lopori River. The Lopori River joins with the Maringa River to the south, to form the Lulonga River, a tributary of the Congo River. The Bolombo flows through the Lopori / Maringa basin, also known as the Maringa-Lopori-Wamba forest Landscape, an area of great ecological importance.

The major tributaries of the Bolombo include the Bloia River, the Loniuka and the Lololu.
