= John Thomas North =

English businessman and investor

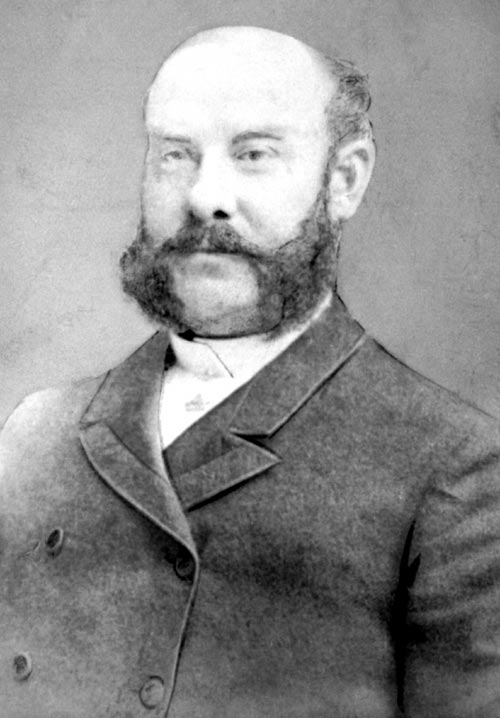
- Born: 30 January 1842; Leeds, Yorkshire, England
- Died: 5 May 1896 (aged 54); London, England
- Other names: The Nitrate King, Colonel North
- Occupations: Businessman and investor
- Known for: Nitrates, banking, Chilean Civil War

John Thomas North (30 January 1842 – 5 May 1896) was an English investor and businessman. North was born in Leeds, Yorkshire, the son of a coal merchant and a churchwarden. At the age of fifteen he was apprenticed to millwrights and engineers before working for several years as a mechanic. He moved to Chile where his first occupation was as a boiler riveter in Huasco. He later moved to the then Peruvian town of Iquique where he worked as a waterworks operator, importer and ship owner. The War of the Pacific (1879–1883) provided North with an opportunity to purchase large numbers of bonds in the Peruvian nitrate industry. When Chile annexed Iquique and the surrounding province of Tarapacá the Chilean government transferred ownership of the nitrate fields to the bondholders. North was thus able to take a monopoly share of the lucrative Chilean nitrate industry for a very small initial investment, becoming known as "The Nitrate King".

North built upon his nitrates business by expanding into further monopolies in waterworks and freight railways, but also owned several iron and coal fields. North maintained his monopolies by employing lawyers to block competing entrepreneurs both in court and the Chilean National Congress. This was allowed by Chilean president Domingo Santa María, but Santa María's successor, José Manuel Balmaceda, became concerned that Tarapacá was starting to resemble a "state within a state" and resolved to break North's monopoly. Balmaceda had to force competition reforms through against opposition in congress, amongst a series of disputes which would eventually escalate into the 1891 Chilean Civil War between the president and the congress.

North also had investments in the Anglo-Belgian India Rubber Company which operated a concession in the Congo Free State. This company was involved in the extraction and export of rubber from the state, another highly profitable business, but later became involved in abuses of human rights against those under its power. However North's finances were eventually depleted and when he died his business empire had collapsed.

== Early life ==
North was born in Leeds, Yorkshire, on 30 January 1842, the son of a coal merchant and a churchwarden. At the age of fifteen he was apprenticed to millwrights and engineers before working for several years as a mechanic. He moved to Chile in South America at the age of 23 where his first occupation was as a boiler riveter in Huasco. He moved from Huasco to Iquique in the province of Tarapacá, which was then part of Peru. Here North established what later became a large business empire, working as a waterworks operator, importer and ship owner.

== War of the Pacific ==
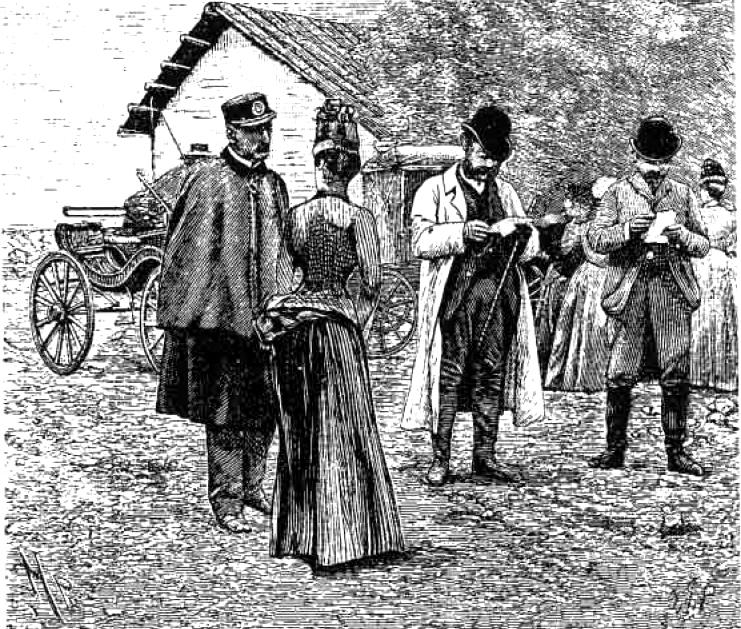
North at a circa 1890 garden party with General Baquedano, commander in chief of the Chilean Army in the War of the Pacific

Territorial disputes between Chile, Peru and Bolivia triggered the War of the Pacific in 1879 with Chile invading and occupying Peruvian and Bolivian land. In the course of the war, North suffered damage to his waterworks, and one of his ships was sunk. However he also befriended the Chilean Admiral Patricio Lynch who later supported him in his business ventures. During the war, North was assisted by two British men: Robert Harvey, who had worked for the Peruvian government in the nitrates (saltpetre) industry, and John Dawson, a banker. North was able to use Harvey's knowledge of the nitrates business and credit provided by Dawson to purchase nitrates bond certificates at low prices from investors who were panicked by Peru's poor military performance during the war. After the war, the Chilean government annexed Tarapacá and allowed the bond holders to take possession of the title deeds to the nitrate fields, perhaps influenced by appeals from North's friends. North thus managed to secure a large share of the Chilean nitrate industry for a very small initial investment in almost worthless bonds. The reason that the Chilean government allowed this is that it would have cost them GBP£4 million to buy the bonds from the mainly British nitrate speculators. By allowing the speculators to start mining the Chilean government could take a share of profits via export duties without having to provide the initial capital costs to begin production of nitrates.

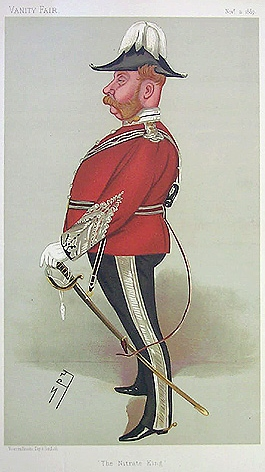
An 1889 caricature of "The Nitrate King"

North left Chile and returned to the United Kingdom in order to raise credit to provide for machinery, transport and employment costs. It was there, in February 1883—still eight months before Peru officially ceded the nitrate fields to Chile—that he established the Liverpool Nitrate Company. North dispatched Robert Harvey to Chile with equipment and engineers to begin construction of the mines whilst North remained in Britain to manage the financial side of the enterprise. The mines were in operation by 1884 and producing 3,000 short tons of nitrates per month. The company turned large profits and was able to pay dividends in excess of 20% each year until 1886 when it was liquidated by North and his partners in order to found other companies. As a result of his fantastic profits North became known as "The King of Nitrates" and was a well known public figure in England.

Nitrates were an important source of income for the Chilean government and an increase in export duty from CLP 4 pesos per ton in 1878 to CLP 22 in 1882 resulted in revenue from nitrates increasing from CLP 6 to 25 million. This allowed the government to make cuts in both income and land tax. The reliance of Chile upon its nitrate income caused conflict between the government and the nitrate production cartel. The cartel wanted to maximise the price of nitrates by cutting production whilst the government wanted to maximise their duty income by maximising exports. The nature of the trade meant that the Chilean economy was also totally dependent on imports and exports to and from Britain. The periodic downturns in nitrate revenue caused by the cartel cutting production eventually forced the Chilean government to print more money, causing inflation to increase and the peso to devalue.

== North's monopolies ==
In the meantime North continued to invest in Chile and founded the Nitrate Railway Company which held a monopoly on nitrate rail transport in Tarapacá and also held a monopoly on the water supply in Iquique. He also owned several coal and iron fields along the Biobío River and a gasworks at Iquique. In Britain he set up North's Navigation Collieries (1889) Ltd. in Glamorgan, south Wales, a venture which turned out to be one of his most successful. By 1920 his Welsh company employed over 6,000 miners and produced over one million tons of coal per year. The development of North's Navigation Collieries Ltd. was largely responsible for the rapid growth of Maesteg and the Llynfi Valley during the years 1890 to 1910. In addition, his nitrate business was the primary cause of the development of the towns of Iquique and Pisagua. To maintain his monopolies, North employed lawyers to block competing entrepreneurs both in court and the Chilean National Congress. Under president Domingo Santa María, North's monopolies went unchallenged, and Santa María's successor in 1886, José Manuel Balmaceda, initially allowed the situation to continue. However, Balmaceda became concerned that the situation in Tarapacá was starting to resemble a "state within a state" and decided to break North's monopoly. Congress was not supportive and Balmaceda had to force through reforms to restore competition in the province. Increasing disputes between Balmaceda and Congress resulted in the outbreak of the Civil War in 1891.

In the meantime North enjoyed the status of a famous high society gentleman in Britain and was worth US$10 million in 1889. He was a friend of the Prince of Wales, later to become Edward VII, and was described, by The New York Times as a "lion" of the London social season. He was the owner of a 600-acre (2.4 km^{2}) estate with extensive stables and a mansion, Avery Hill, near to Eltham in Kent, which was subsequently acquired by the LCC and opened as a ladies teacher-training college in 1906. North owned several racing horses and won several British racing trophies. North visited the United States in July 1889 where he was described as a member of the nouveau riche and a "Chilean Monte Cristo" because of his recent rise to fame and fortune. He became known as Colonel North as he was appointed Honorary Colonel of the Tower Hamlets Regiment of Volunteer Engineers on 25 March 1885. He regularly allowed the regiment of 250 men to camp in the gardens of his estate for three days at a time. During this time he would hold festivals for the men and the local villagers and at one of these events he challenged the Lieutenant-Colonel to a footrace and won.

== Financial decline ==
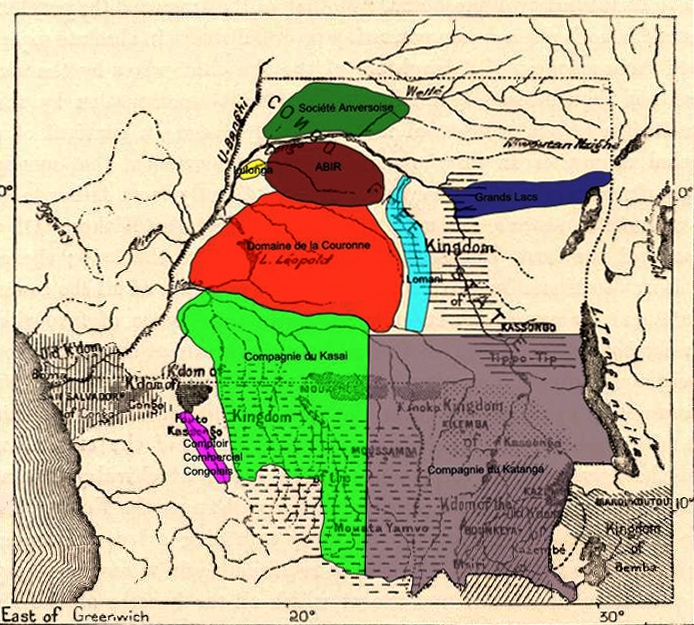
Congo Free State concession companies, ABIR shown in dark red

North was approached by King Leopold II of Belgium at a horse racing event to provide funds to establish a concession company to extract rubber from the Congo Free State. North agreed and provided GBP£40,000 of the BEF250,000 initial investment to set up the Anglo-Belgian India Rubber Company (ABIR) at Antwerp on 6 August 1892. ABIR had exclusive rights to all forest products from the Maringa-Lopori basin for 30 years and had police powers within the limits of the concession to enforce the collection of rubber as a tax. The company was initially very successful but by 1898, two years after North's death, his heirs had sold his shares in the company. The company later became infamous for human rights abuses of the inhabitants of its concession and fell into financial troubles.

Despite his varied investments across the world North's finances eventually dwindled, his decline was accelerated by the Chilean Civil War. By the time he died in London on 5 May 1896 his business empire had collapsed. His death occurred within half an hour of eating some oysters. The shells were sent for analysis but it was suspected that heart problems were the cause of death. He donated Kirkstall Abbey to the city of Leeds, a plaque in the Gift Shop of the Abbey is inscribed "The Abbey and part of the adjoining lands were acquired from the representatives of the Earl of Cardigan by Colonel J.T North a native of Leeds and presented by him to the Corporation of Leeds in the year 1889 to be held in trust for his fellow citizens as a place of public resort and recreation for ever works of preservation were completed by the Corporation in the year 1895". North also made donations to Leeds Infirmary and the Yorkshire College of Science, which later became the University of Leeds.

== Bibliography ==
- Bethell, Leslie (1986), The Cambridge History of Latin America, Cambridge: Cambridge University Press, ISBN 0-521-24517-6.
- Collier, Simon; Sater, William F (1996), A History of Chile, 1808-1994, Cambridge: Cambridge University Press, ISBN 0-521-56827-7.
- Ewans, Martin (2002), European Atrocity, African Catastrophe, Routledge, ISBN 978-0-7007-1589-3
- Harms, Robert (1975), "The End of Red Rubber: A Reassessment", The Journal of African History, 16 (1): 73–88, doi:10.1017/S0021853700014110, JSTOR 181099
- Harms, Robert (1983), "The World Abir Made: The Margina-Lopori Basin, 1885-1903", African Economic History (12): 122–139, doi:10.2307/3601320, JSTOR 3601320
- Leonard, Thomas M (2006), Encyclopedia of the Developing World, Taylor & Francis, ISBN 0-415-97664-2.
- Rector, John Lawrence (2003), The History of Chile, Greenwood Publishing Group, ISBN 0-313-31759-3.
