= Maringa =

Maringa may refer to:

- Maringa people, a sub-group of the Burarra Aboriginal Australian people
- Maringá, a city in the state of Paraná in southern Brazil
- Maringa River in the Democratic Republic of the Congo
- Maringa-Lopori-Wamba Landscape, an ecologically sensitive area in the Democratic Republic of the Congo
- Nova Maringá, a municipality in the state of Mato Grosso in the Central-West Region of Brazil
- Grêmio de Esportes Maringá, a Brazilian soccer club from the city of Maringá
- Roman Catholic Archdiocese of Maringá, an archdiocese located in the city of Maringá
- Maringá Regional Airport, the airport serving Maringá, Brazil
- Palm-wine music, known as "Maringa" in Sierra Leone
