= Bolia =

Bolia may refer to:

- an ethnic subgroup of the Mongo people
- a Bantu language, see Guthrie classification of Bantu languages
- Bolia (town) in Inongo Territory of Mai-Ndombe Province of the Democratic Republic of the Congo
- the Bolia River in the Democratic Republic of the Congo, tributary of the Bolombo River
- Bolia Sector, a fourth-level subdivision in Inongo Territory, Mai-Ndombe Province, Democratic Republic of the Congo
- the Battle of Bolia a battle in 469 CE in eastern Europe
- the Bolia River in eastern Europe now known as the Ipeľ
- Bolia, the Latin name of the river Korana
