= Lomako =

Lomako may refer to:

- Lomako River, a river in Équateur province, Democratic Republic of the Congo
- Pyotr Lomako (1904–1990), Soviet politician and economist
