= Lulonga Company =

Congolese concession company

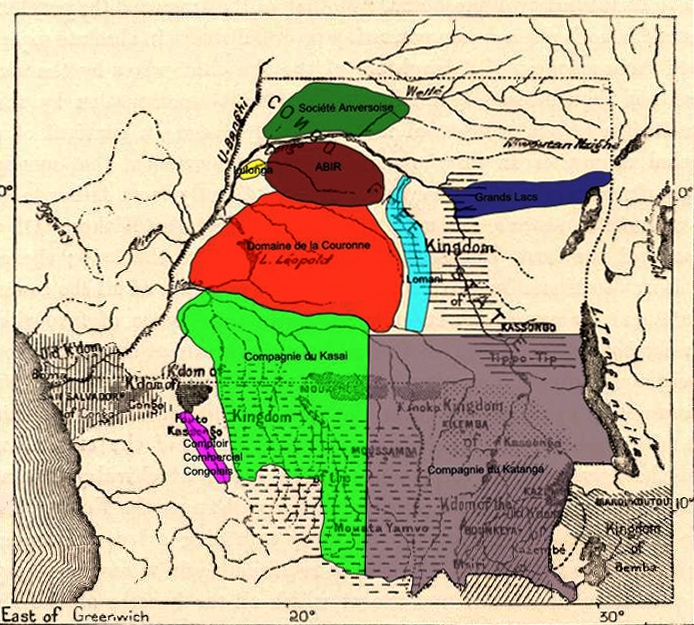
Congo Free State concession companies, Lulonga Company shown in yellow

The Lulonga Company was a concession company of the Congo Free State. It was, with the Société Anversoise and the Abir Congo Company, one of the main producers of rubber in the Free State. The company's rubber production declined in the early 20th century as a result of over harvesting of the natural rubber vine (Landolphia owariensis gentili) and the entire concession produced just seven tons of rubber in 1905. Like Abir and the Société Anversoise, the Lulonga Company handed back control of the concession to the Congo Free State in 1906.

== Bibliography ==
- Harms, Robert (1975), "The End of Red Rubber: A Reassessment", The Journal of African History, 16 (1): 73–88, doi:10.1017/S0021853700014110, JSTOR 181099
- Harms, Robert (1983), "The World Abir Made: The Margina-Lopori Basin, 1885-1903", African Economic History (12): 122–139, doi:10.2307/3601320, JSTOR 3601320
