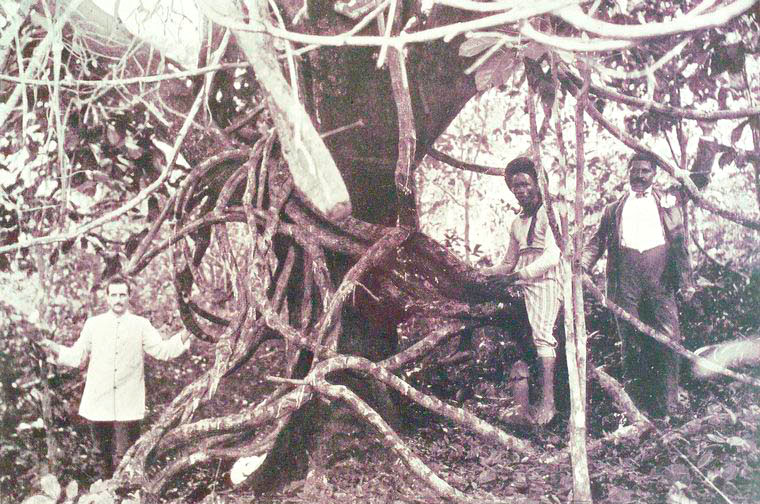
- Landolphia owariensis wrapping around a fig tree

Scientific classification
- Kingdom: Plantae
- Clade: Tracheophytes
- Clade: Angiosperms
- Clade: Eudicots
- Clade: Asterids
- Order: Gentianales
- Family: Apocynaceae
- Genus: Landolphia
- Species: L. owariensis

Binomial name
- Landolphia owariensis P.Beauv., 1805

= Landolphia owariensis =

Species of plant

Landolphia owariensis is a species of liana from the family Apocynaceae found in tropical Africa. Latex can be extracted from this plant for the manufacture of natural rubber. Other names for this vine are eta, the white rubber vine and the Congo rubber plant. Congo rubber was a commercial rubber exported from the Congo Free State starting in 1890, most notable for its forced harvesting under conditions of great human suffering, in the Congo Free State, detailed in the 1904 Casement Report. From 1885 to 1908, millions perished as a result of execution, forced labor, famine, and disease, while birth rates rapidly declined, with population falling by millions in this period; some writers estimate this loss to be as high as 10 million people.

== Description ==
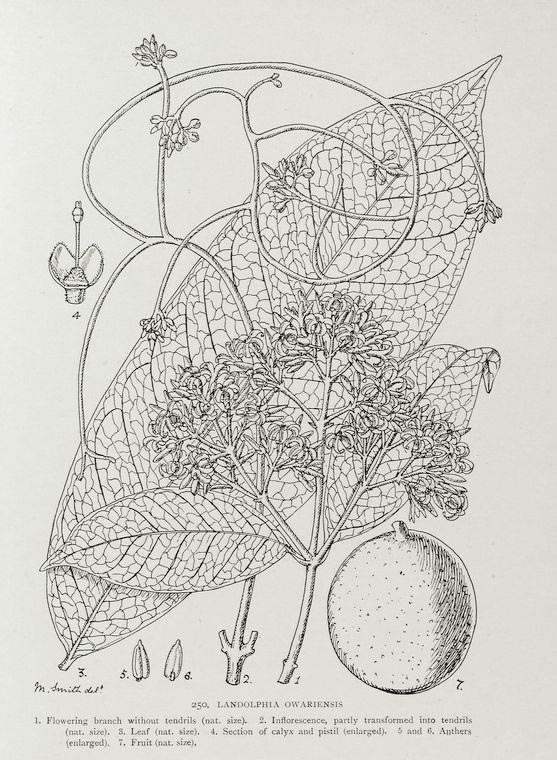
Botanical illustration

When growing in savannah, Landolphia owariensis is an erect bush or small tree, but when growing among trees, it can develop into a woody vine with a stem that grows to a metre wide and 100 m (330 ft) long. The bark is rough, dark brown or greyish-brown, and often covered with pale yellow lenticels; it exudes a milky juice when damaged. The leaves grow in opposite pairs and are oblong, elliptical or obovate, up to 25 by 12 cm (10 by 5 in). The young leaves are reddish at first but the upper sides of the leaf blades later become dark green and glossy, with a pale midrib. The flowers are in terminal panicles. The peduncles and calyx lobes are clad in brown hairs, and the corolla tube and lobes are yellowish, pinkish or white. The flowers are followed by rounded, wrinkled fruit resembling oranges. These are juicy and slightly acidic when ripe, with usually three seeds surrounded by soft, edible pulp.

The main trunk soon divides into several stout stems which repeatedly branch as they clamber over their host trees. After the fruit have fallen, the stems elongate into tendrils which twist spirally and secure the vine to its host.

== Distribution and habitat ==
Landolphia owariensis is native to the tropics of Africa, its range extending from Guinea in West Africa to Sudan and Tanzania in East Africa. When growing in open savannah it takes the form of a bush, but in forested areas it becomes a vine and can climb trees, reaching heights of 70 m (230 ft) or more. It has a rhizome which can survive bush fires, readily throwing up shoots which flower and fruit at a young age even before the twigs have become lignified.

== Uses ==
The fruit are gathered for human consumption, and are either eaten fresh or fermented into an alcoholic beverage.

The latex used to be gathered for the manufacture of rubber. The latex coagulates rapidly after extraction, and one traditional method of collection was to make an incision on the stem and allow the latex to trickle onto the gatherer's hand and arm where it rapidly coagulated. When this process had been repeated several times, the rubber "sleeve" was unrolled off the arm. The latex has been used to mix with the ground up seeds of Strophanthus to make arrow poison, and to glue the poison to the arrow-head. The latex is also used by itself as a birdlime to catch small birds and animals.

Landolphia owariensis has been used extensively in traditional medicine, with the leaves and stems being used as an anti-microbial, and in the treatment of venereal disease and of colic. Other uses include as a vermifuge, a purgative, an analgesic and an anti-inflammatory. A decoction prepared from the leaves is used against malaria and as a purgative; the bark is used against worms and an extract of the roots against gonorrhea. The latex that oozes from wounds can be drunk, or used as an enema to treat intestinal worms.

In modern times Landolphia owariensis is primarily used for its fruits, but occasionally for rubber band production; it was a major source for rubber from nations including Sierra Leone, Ghana, and Nigeria in the early 1900s.

== History ==
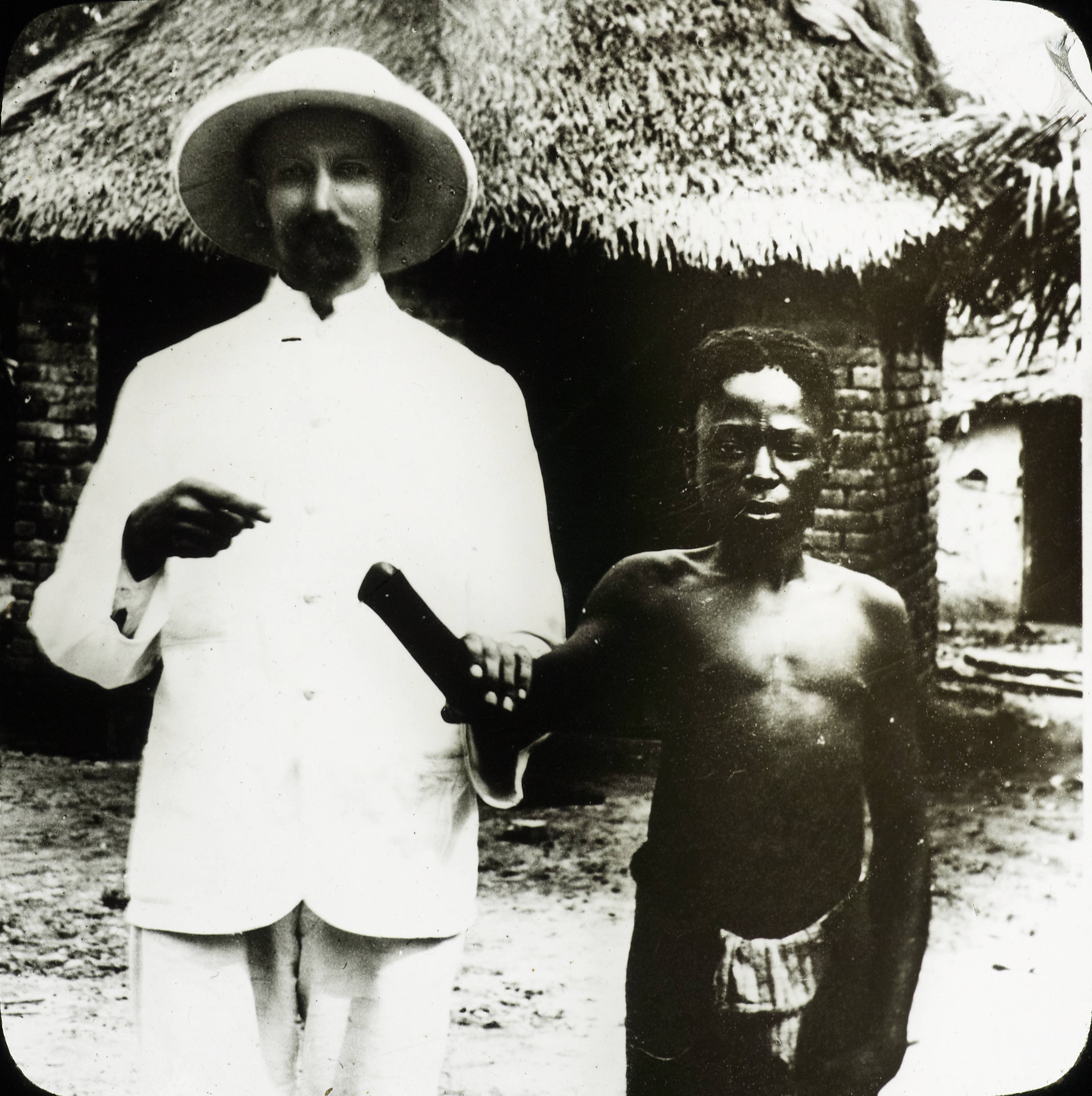
Victim of the rubber industry in Congo. Hands were chopped off to account for bullets that had not been used to kill people.

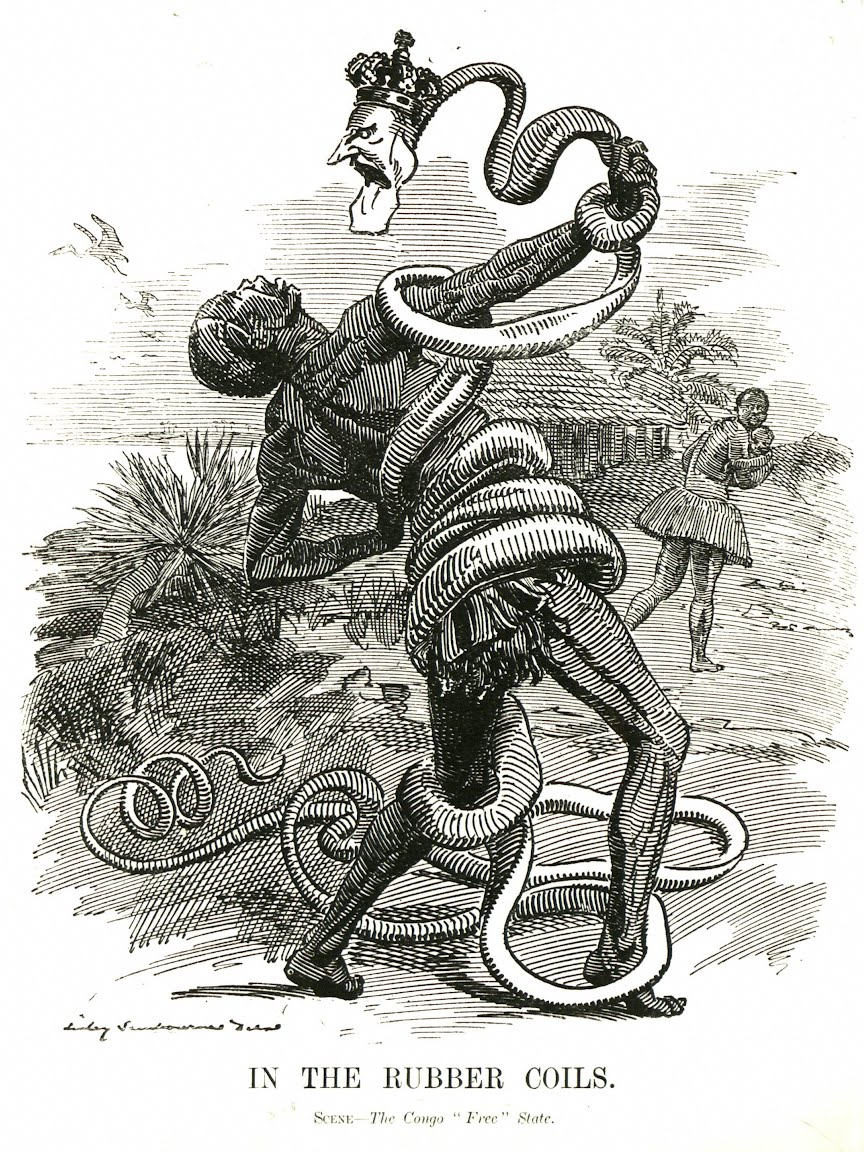
A 1906 cartoon from the British satirical magazine Punch, depicting King Leopold II as a rubber vine curled around the body of a Congolese man

In 1885, Leopold II established the Congo Free State under the auspices of the International Association of the Congo, by securing the European community's agreement with the claim that he was involved in humanitarian and philanthropic work. To monopolize the resources of the entire Congo Free State, Leopold issued three decrees in 1891 and 1892 that stripped control of resources from the native populations and required them to work. Collectively, these forced the natives to deliver all ivory and rubber, harvested or found, to state officers or to the state's monopoly concession companies, thus nearly completing Leopold's monopoly of the Congo's ivory and rubber trade. The rubber came from wild vines in the jungle, unlike the rubber from Brazil (Hevea brasiliensis), which was tapped from trees. To extract the rubber, instead of tapping the vines, the Congolese workers would slash them and lather their bodies with the rubber latex. When the latex hardened, it would be scraped off the skin in a painful manner, as it took off the worker's hair with it. The Force Publique, the Free State's military, was used to enforce the rubber quotas. During the 1890s, the Force Publique's primary role was to enforce a system of corvée labour to promote the rubber trade. Armed with modern weapons and the chicotte—a bull whip made of hippopotamus hide—the Force Publique routinely took and tortured hostages, slaughtered families of rebels, and flogged and raped Congolese people. Failure to meet the rubber collection quotas was punishable by death. Recalcitrant villages were burned and Force Publique soldiers were sometimes required to provide a severed hand from their victims as proof that they had not misused their weapons. A Catholic priest quotes a man, Tswambe, speaking of a hated state official, Léon Fiévez, who ran a district along the river 500 kilometres (300 mi) north of Stanley Pool:

All blacks saw this man as the devil of the Equator...From all the bodies killed in the field, you had to cut off the hands. He wanted to see the number of hands cut off by each soldier, who had to bring them in baskets...A village which refused to provide rubber would be completely swept clean. As a young man, I saw [Fiévez's] soldier Molili, then guarding the village of Boyeka, take a net, put ten arrested natives in it, attach big stones to the net, and make it tumble into the river...Rubber causes these torments; that's why we no longer want to hear its name spoken. Soldiers made young men kill or rape their own mothers and sisters.

=== Historic production methods ===
According to a 1905 article (shortly after the peak of Congo production):

Red Kasai and Congo rubbers are obtained from the same species of vines, namely, the Landolphia, Owariensis Pal. Beauv., L. Gentilii De Wild and L. Droogmansiana De Wild. The difference in color, which is the chief distinction, is probably due to the different climatic conditions in the two districts, and different modes of collecting and coagulating, and not to any inherent property of the latices. Landolphia Klainei also gives a reddish rubber when grown under the same conditions as the above mentioned species. The red colour of the rubber appears to be accentuated more and more as the district in which the vine is cultivated is farther from the zone known as the Great Equatorial Forest. In the south of the Congo territory, for instance, latitude 7^{S} and 8^{S}, the india-rubber collected is almost red. In the Upper Congo the latex from these varieties is very watery, whilst in the Kasai district it is thick. In the former district it is coagulated by means of Bosanga, and in the latter it coagulates spontaneously in contact with air.

The bosanga method is described in the 1907 Journal of the African Society (as noted in a preface by the editor and postscript by the chairman of the meeting, a vastly more pleasant description than the reports of the Congo Reform Association(CRA). The chairman, a member of the CRA, expressed some concern about this discrepancy.):

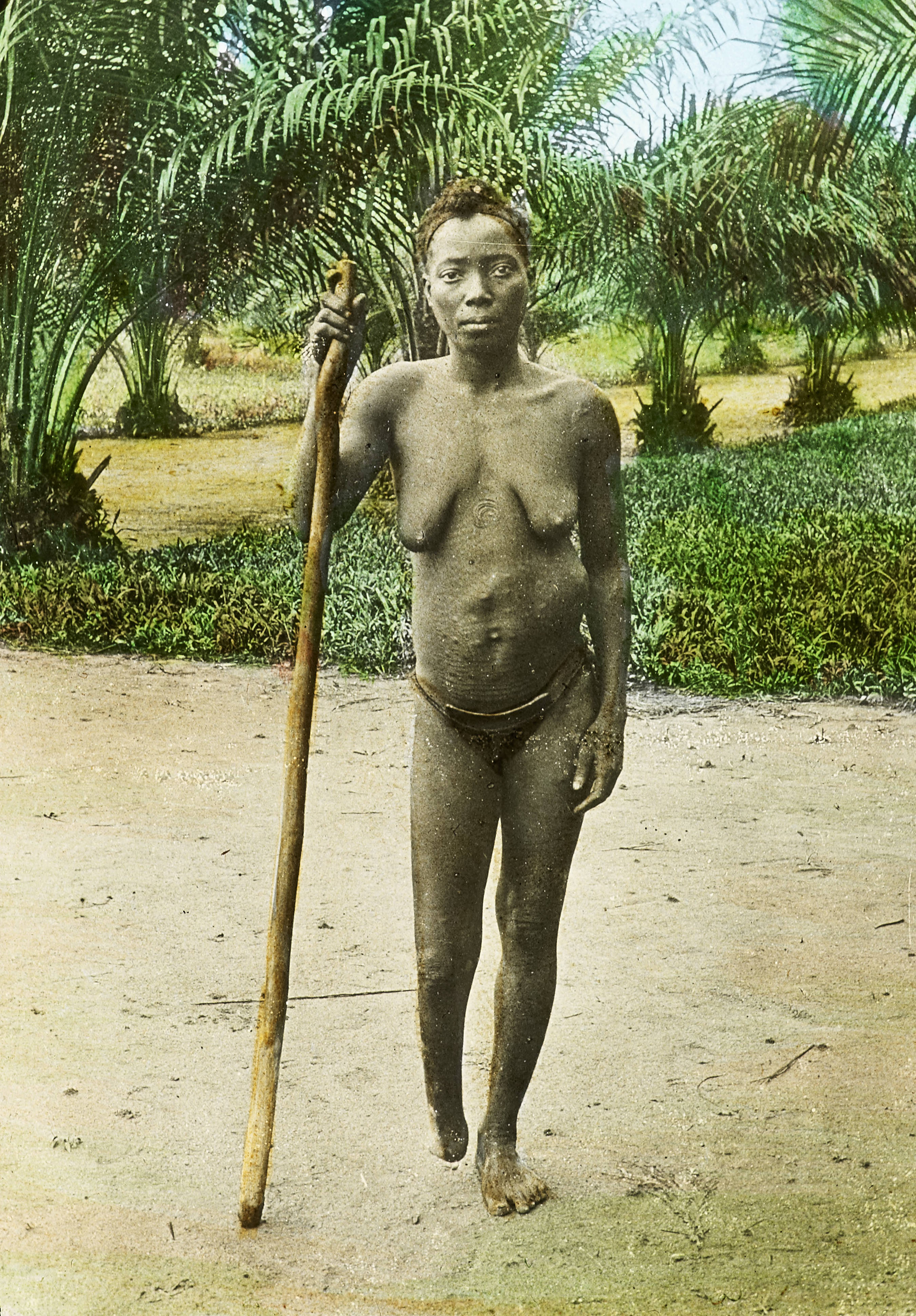
Female atrocity victim of Congo's rubber industry.

Makala is one of the great rubber centres of the Congo, and during my long stay at that post, I had excellent opportunities of studying the method of rubber-collection.

In different districts, this varies considerably. At Makala, each adult man has to bring in 5 kilos per month, and this he can collect in 40 working hours. Payment is at the rate of 30 centimes per kilo, of which about 10 per cent. is given to the chief and the balance to the actual gatherer.

The natives usually go out in couples—build a little shanty in the midst of the jungle and work in a circle round it. Climbing the rubber-bearing tree or vine, they slash the bark with two or three V-shaped cuts, one below the other, and then arrange a broad leaf underneath, so as to form a trough. This is to conduct the sap, which oozes out, about the consistency and colour of ideal milk, into a gourd, or preferably, a galley-pot, procured at the station. The rubber from trees and vines is mixed promiscuously, the natives preferring to tap the latter, as they say it flows more freely. In any case, they put some vine rubber into that from the trees, as it coagulates more rapidly.

Returned to their hut, the gatherers pour the sap into an earthenware pot containing water, place it on the fire and stir it with a stick which they call bosanga. In about ten minutes the rubber, owing to the acid in the bosanga, begins to collect round the stick, and soon a mass is formed. This is lifted out, placed on a big leaf and rinsed with clean cold water. Then, enveloped in leaves, it is kneaded for a minute or two with hands or feet, to press out the remaining moisture. It is now ready to be cut up into rough cubes, which are spread to dry on a little platform built over the fire. Here it remains for an hour or two, before it is packed in the loosely made baskets in which the native carries it to the station.

As the rubber-laden caravan of men, women and children, headed by the chief and the forest-guard, wind their way from their village into the post, discordant notes are blown on a trumpet made from an antelope-horn, and all chant a chorus. Long before the party reaches the post, this barbaric music, ever increasing in volume, heralds their approach to the official in charge, and he makes his preparations to receive the rubber.

He meets the laden caravan at the beam-scale of the station where the rough baskets are weighed and the price paid in cloth, salt, bells, soap, beads and suchlike coveted treasures. The payment over, off they all rush, like children out of school, yelling and shouting at the top of their voices.

The rubber is then spread on platforms under large sheds, until the women workers of the post have cut it into neat little cubes. This done, for three months it lies in layers on the platforms to dry and is turned once a fortnight, till all the moisture has evaporated. During this process it loses some 25% in weight.

Meanwhile very neatly plaited baskets are being prepared from rattan cane, into which the dry rubber is packed, till every basket weighs exactly 5 lbs. A tin label is attached to each, with the distinctive number and place of origin, and they are then laid out in long rows, ready for transport by porters, canoe, rail and steamer to Europe.

== See also ==
- Abir Congo Company
- Heart of Darkness
- List of plants of Burkina Faso
- Lulonga Company
