= Bolia (town) =

Coordinates: 0°51′47″S 18°10′25″E

Bolia is a small town in Inongo Territory of Mai-Ndombe Province of the Democratic Republic of the Congo, located east of Lake Tumba. It is the headquarters for the Bolia Sector, which includes Bokwala, Lokanga, and Nkile. Its elevation is about 300 meters.

This was also the general location of the Bolia Kingdom. It emerged sometime in the late 17th or early 18th-century.
