= Société Anversoise du Commerce au Congo =

Concession company of the Congo Free State

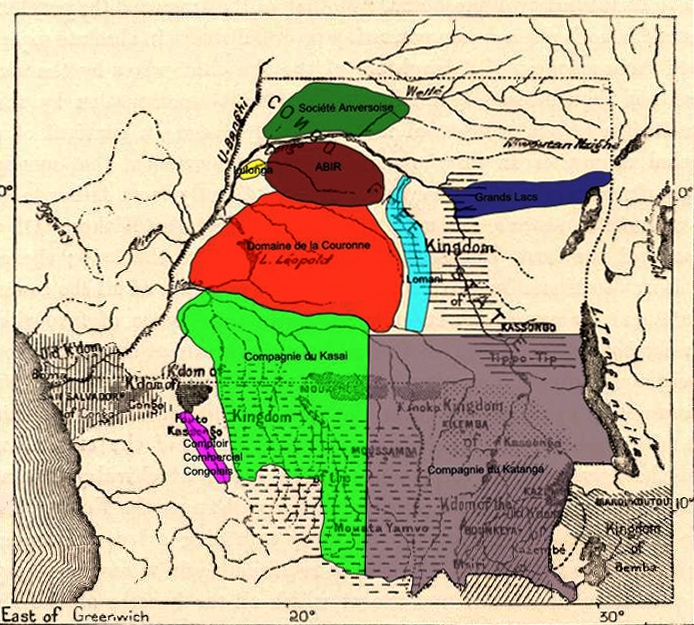
Congo Free State concession companies, Société Anversoise shown in dark green

The Société Anversoise (English: Company of Antwerp) was a concession company of the Congo Free State, headquartered in Antwerp. It was, with the Lulonga Company and the Abir Congo Company, one of the main producers of rubber in the Free State. Alongside Abir and the Lulonga Company the Société Anversoise handed back control of the concession to the Congo Free State in 1906. The Société Anversoise merged with Abir in 1911 to form the Compagnie du Congo Belge with a focus of the management of rubber plantations instead of the harvesting of naturally occurring rubber. The Société Anversoise was quoted on the Stock Exchange in Antwerp from 27 July 1898.

== See also ==
- Adrien Goffinet

== Bibliography ==
- Christopher, AJ (1984), Colonial Africa, Routledge, ISBN 978-0-389-20452-7
- Harms, Robert (1975), "The End of Red Rubber: A Reassessment", The Journal of African History, 16 (1): 73–88, doi:10.1017/S0021853700014110, JSTOR 181099
- Harms, Robert (1983), "The World Abir Made: The Margina-Lopori Basin, 1885-1903", African Economic History (12): 122–139, doi:10.2307/3601320, JSTOR 3601320
