= Maringa-Lopori-Wamba Landscape =

- Location within Democratic Republic of the Congo
- Coordinates: 1.4061°N 22.1265°E
- Country: Democratic Republic of Congo
- Province: Tshuapa District
- Territory: Ikela Territory

The Maringa-Lopori-Wamba Landscape (MLW) is an ecologically sensitive landscape in the Democratic Republic of the Congo within the Maringa / Lopori basin. Since 1973 a Japanese team has been researching the bonobo population near the village of Wamba, and the Luo Scientific Reserve was established in 1990. However, research was discontinued after political disorder started in 1991 followed by civil war in 1997, resuming only in the mid-2000s.

== Location ==
The Maringa-Lopori-Wamba (MLW) forest Landscape covers 74,000 square kilometres (29,000 sq mi) in north-central Democratic Republic of the Congo. The human population as of 2007 was estimated to be 586,732 inhabitants with a density of 8 inhabitants/km^{2}. There were 2-4 inhabitants/km^{2} in the proposed or existing protected areas and 31.8 inhabitants/km^{2} in the proposed Sylvo-Agro-Pastoral zone.

== History ==
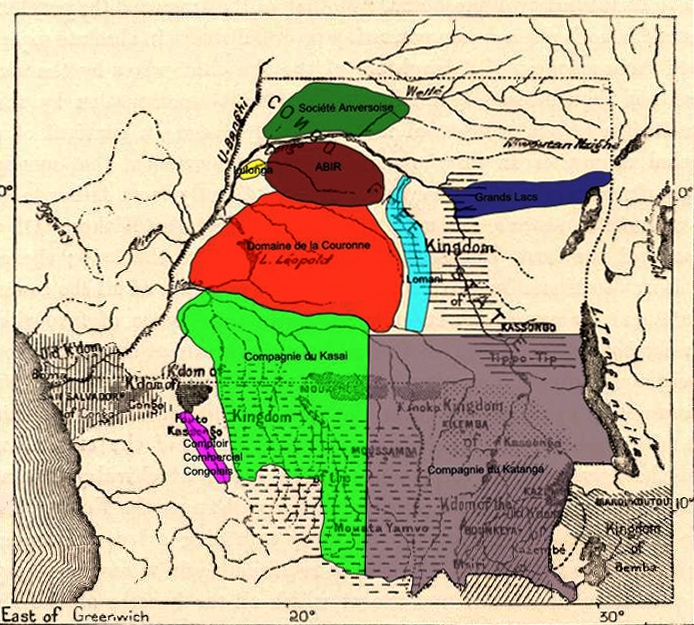
Congo Free State concession companies, ABIR shown in dark red

The local populace in the MLW were yam and cassava farmers who engaged in trade with river fishermen and pygmy hunters. In 1885 a force of the Manyema people, followers of Tippu Tip, the Swahili-Zanzibari slave trader, arrived at the head of the Lopori River from Stanley Falls. They took hostages from nearby villages to ransom in return for ivory. By 1892 they had enrolled local people into their army and controlled the entire eastern half of the basin.

The Belgian administrators of the Congo Free State were concerned by this development, and, in 1889, enacted the Monopoly Act, which declared that all products in the area were to be under their jurisdiction alone. The Free State also began a campaign to drive the slavers, traders and the Manyema from the region, the first stage of which was the establishment of a supply post at Basankusu, in May 1890. The entire basin was under Free State control by 1898. The Free State started to levy taxes, payable in ivory, but which soon switched to wild rubber. By September 1892, the Free State was using its military forces to attack and occupy villages in the Lulonga and Maringa river valleys in order to expand its tax base.

ABIR company posts within the concession

The concession to farm rubber was granted to the Abir Congo Company, which established its headquarters at Basankusu, in 1893. Its position at the confluence of the Maringa and Lopori, allowed ABIR to expand along these rivers and their tributaries, establishing new posts along the way. The company established posts throughout the region, staffed by agents who were mainly paid on commission and used brutal methods to force the villagers to pay their rubber taxes. The effort of rubber collection did not leave enough time for farming, and the villagers began to suffer from malnutrition and starvation. Fatal diseases, such as Smallpox and Sleeping Sickness, also spread in the region. To save time, harvesters resorted to cutting down the rubber plants to obtain their sap. Reports of abuses led the Free State to conduct investigations into Abir's conduct, and, in 1905, to take back the concession. Soon after, with no remaining plants, the rubber tax was abolished.

== Threats ==
The MLW Landscape is in one of the least developed and most remote parts of the Congo Basin. The inhabitants are among the poorest in Africa, depending on natural resources to meet their basic needs. Most of the people live by slash-and-burn agriculture, and rely on bushmeat such as porcupine, sitatunga, and forest hog for protein. Cash crops include maize, cassava and peanuts. The growing population is placing more stress on the environment, and there is risk of a revival of logging that could harm the ability of the land to sustain the people and could jeopardize biodiversity.

Local and international institutions headed by the African Wildlife Foundation (AWF) have recently started developing a sustainable land use plan for the MLW. The plan aims to ensure that the economic and cultural needs of the inhabitants are met while conserving the environment. The approach combines AWF's Heartland Conservation Process and the Central African Regional Program for the Environment (CARPE) Program Monitoring Plan. A variety of tools are used including surveys, interviews with local people and satellite image interpretation.

== Sources ==
- Dupain, Jef; Nackoney, Janet; Kibambe, Jean-Paul; Bokelo, Didier; Williams, David (2008). "Maringa-Lopori-Wamba Landscape" (PDF). L'Observatoire des Forêts d'Afrique Centrale. Archived from the original (PDF) on 2016-03-03.
- Harms, Robert (1975). "The End of Red Rubber: A Reassessment". The Journal of African History. 16 (1): 73–88. doi:10.1017/S0021853700014110. JSTOR 181099.
- Harms, Robert (1983), "The World Abir Made: The Maringa-Lopori Basin, 1885–1903", African Economic History (12): 122–139, doi:10.2307/3601320, JSTOR 3601320
- Kimura, Daiji (December 2009). "TABOO OF EATING BONOBO AMONG THE BONGANDO PEOPLE IN THE WAMBA REGION, DEMOCRATIC REPUBLIC OF CONGO" (PDF). African Study Monographs. 30 (4).
