= Befale =

Community in DR Congo

- Location within Democratic Republic of the Congo
- Coordinates: 0.394475°N 20.841408°E
- Country: Democratic Republic of the Congo
- Province: Tshuapa
- Territory: Befale Territory

Population (2012)
  - Total: 3,879
- Climate: Af

Befale is a community in the Democratic Republic of the Congo. It is the administrative center of Befale Territory, located in Tshuapa province. The town lies on the road linking Boende to Basankusu. As of 2012 the estimated population was 3,879.
