= Lopori River =

River in Democratic Republic of the Congo

Location
- Country: Democratic Republic of the Congo

Physical characteristics
- Mouth
  - location: Lulonga River
  - coordinates: 1.236166°N 19.811654°E

The Lopori river is a river in the Democratic Republic of the Congo. The Lopori, and the Maringa River to the south, join near Basankusu to form the Lulonga River, a tributary of the Congo River. The Lopori / Maringa basin is called the Maringa-Lopori-Wamba forest Landscape, an area of great ecological importance.
