= Lulonga River =

River in Democratic Republic of the Congo

Coordinates: 0°38′40″N 18°22′58″E

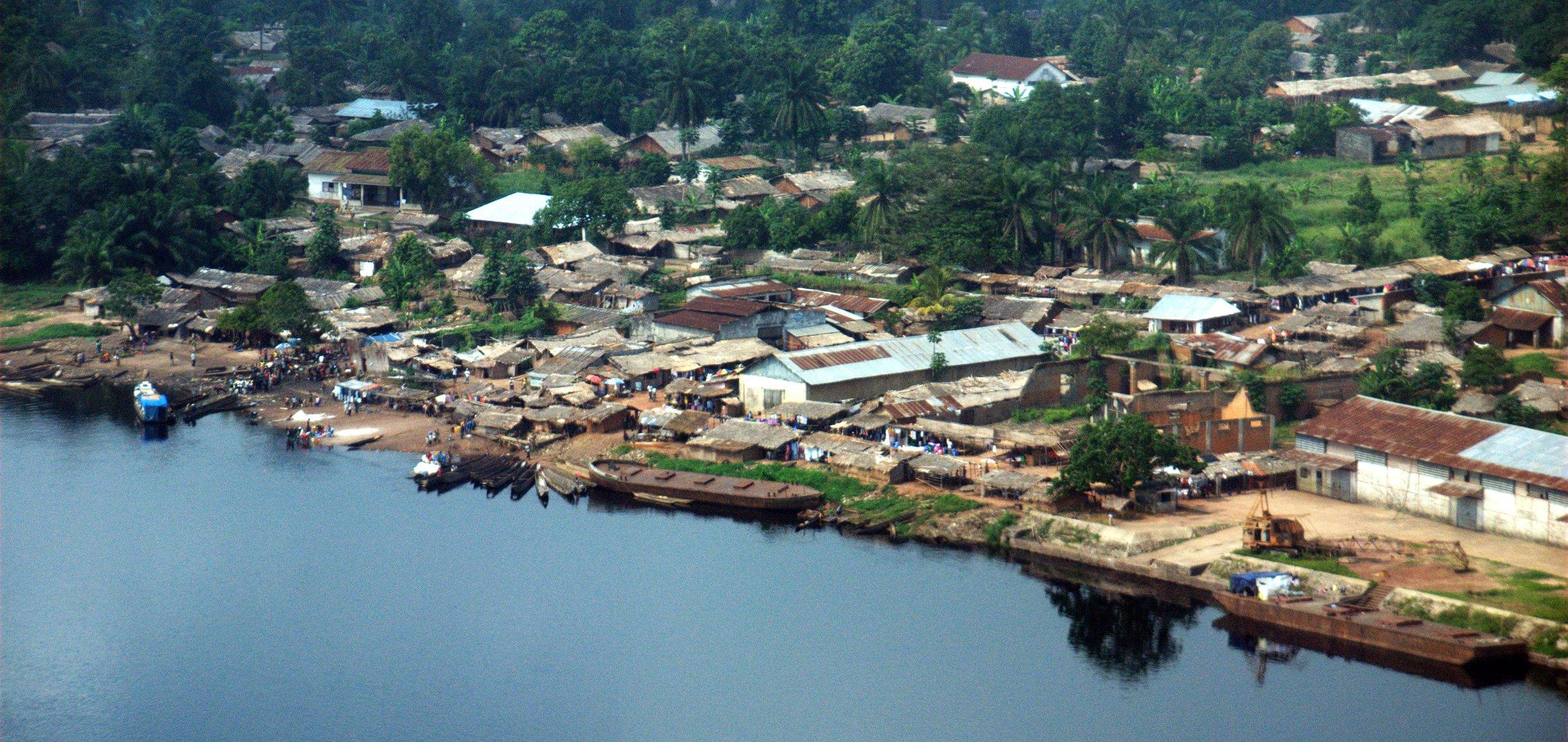
- The Lulonga River at the port of Basankusu

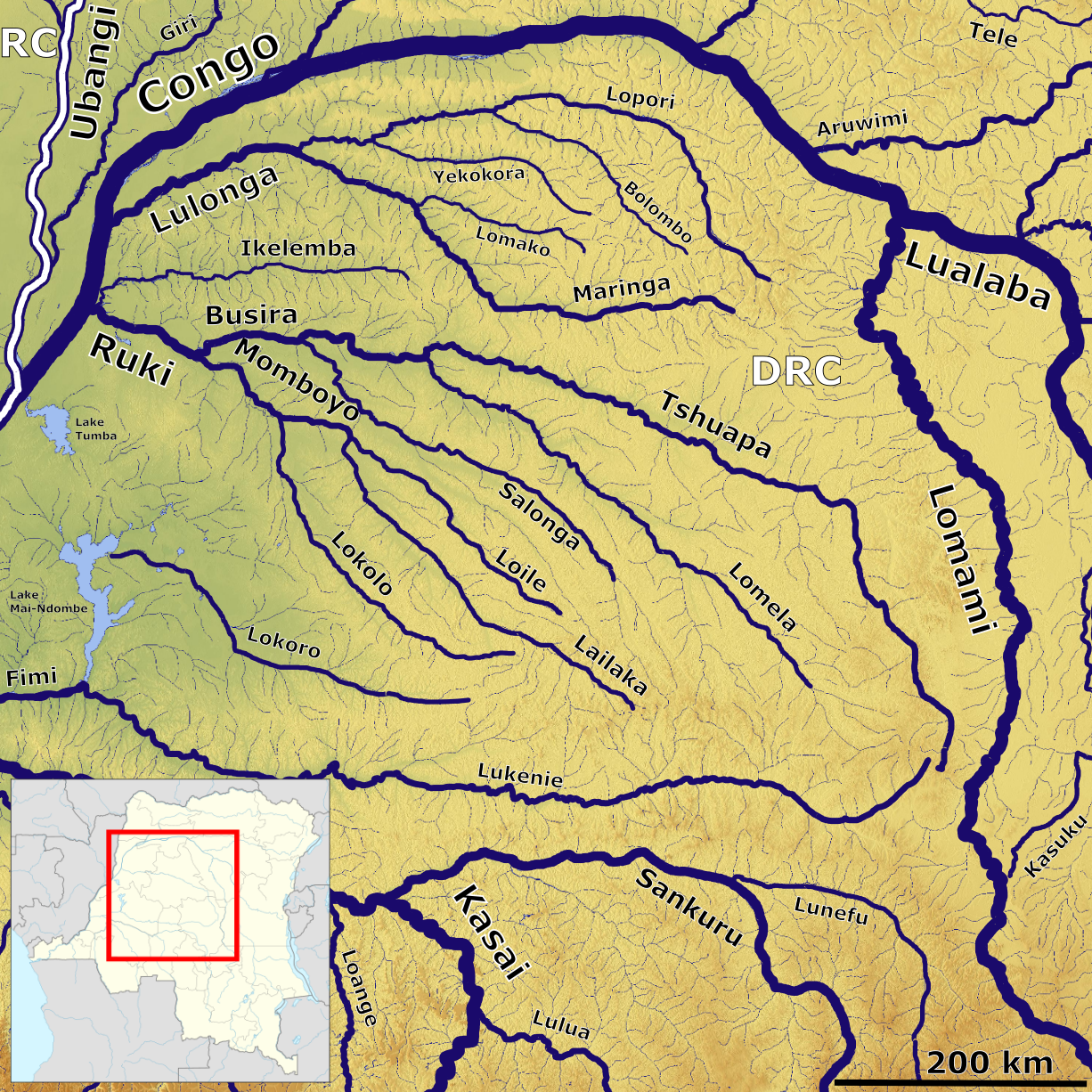
- The rivers of the central Democratic Republic of Congo, with the Lulonga and its tributaries (top left)

Location
- Country: Democratic Republic of the Congo

Physical characteristics
- Mouth
  - location: Congo River
- Length: 200 km (120 mi)
- Basin size: 76,950 km^{2} (29,710 mi^{2})
- Discharge
  - location: Confluence of Congo (near mouth)
  - average: 2,040 m^{3}/s (72,000 cu ft/s)

Basin features
- Tributaries
  - left: Maringa
  - right: Lopori

The Lulonga (Swahili: Mto Lulonga, French: Rivière Lulonga, Dutch: Lulonga Rivier) is a river in the Equateur province of Democratic Republic of the Congo. It is about 200 km long from its beginning at the town of Basankusu. The Lopori and the Maringa join to form the Lulonga there. The Lulonga River flows into the Congo River at the village of Lolanga.
