= Maringa River =

River in Democratic Republic of the Congo

Location
- Country: Democratic Republic of the Congo

Physical characteristics
- Mouth
  - location: Lulonga River
  - coordinates: 1.228572°N 19.817963°E

The Maringa river is a river in the Democratic Republic of the Congo. The Maringa, and the Lopori River to the north, join at Basankusu to form the Lulonga River, a tributary of the Congo River. The Maringa / Lopori basin contains the Maringa-Lopori-Wamba Landscape, an area of great ecological importance. The Ngando people live in the Maringa River area north of Ikela.
