= Edward James Glave =

English travel writer and journalist

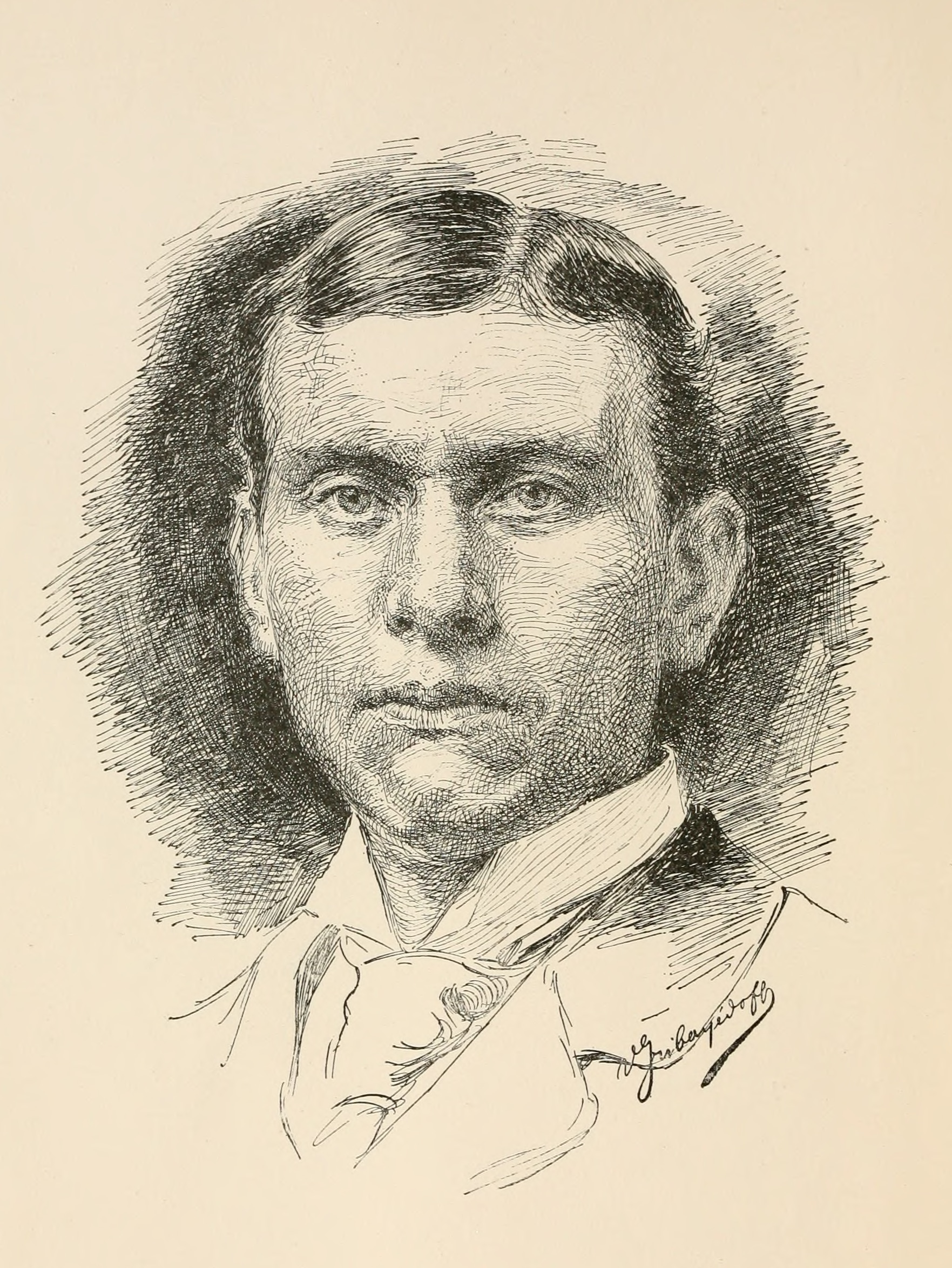
- Born: 13 September 1863; Ripon, England
- Died: 12 May 1895 (aged 31); Matadi, The Congo
- Occupation: Travel writer
- Years active: 1883–1895
- Known for: Exploration of the Congo
- Notable work: In savage Africa; or, Six years of adventure in Congo-land

Edward James Glave (13 September 1863 – 12 May 1895) was an English travel writer and journalist, known for his multiple expeditions in the Congo Free State

== Life ==
E. J. Glave was born in Ripon, England. After graduating from school, Glave became an administrative clerk in London, but this did not particularly satisfy him personally. He entered the service of the Congo Free State, under the control of Belgium, and arrived in Vivi on 12 June 1883. Henry Morton Stanley, King Leopold's colonial agent in the Congo, was impressed by the young Glave. Stanley, who had no children of his own, later saw his foster son in Glave. Glave was allowed to accompany Stanley on the expedition up the Congo river. He was tasked to build an exploratory station in Lukolela while Stanley continued. Glave built the station and managed to make good contacts with the locals. He stayed in Lukolela for two years; on 2 November 1885, he was appointed head of Bolobo station and a month later head of Equator station in Mbandaka. When his contract with the Congo Free State expired in April 1886, he returned to England on June 10, 1886. Glave then offered his services to the American diplomat and businessman Henry Shelton Sanford and was back in the Congo in 1887. In 1889 he returned to England again.

Glave went to the United States where he could profit from lectures on his African experiences. In New York, in 1890, he joined an expedition sponsored by Frank Leslie's Illustrated Newspaper (published by Frank Leslie) to Alaska and British Columbia. His participation was used for advertising by the newspaper. He was the deputy leader and draftsman of the expedition. Glave's travelogues were printed in the newspaper. The following year, he took an expedition over the Chilkoot Pass.

After his travels on the American continent, Glave wanted to go back to Africa, this time to report on the slave trade. With Stanley's help, he managed to convince The Century Magazine to fund the expedition for him. On 25 June 1893, Glave left London. His route began on the east coast of Africa at the Rovuma estuary. Glave managed to find the so-called "Livingstone Tree" on Lake Bangweulu, the tree under which the heart of David Livingstone is supposed to have been buried. Via the Congo, he reached Lukolela station, which he had built years earlier. He collected material for a report on the cruel conditions under Belgian rule. However, this was only published after his death, because he died on 12 May 1895 in the Congolese port city of Matadi.

== Reception ==
Glave's writings on conditions in the Congo were well-cited by contemporary writers. Poet Richard Watson Gilder wrote of his death, "Hero and martyr of humanity, // Dead yesterday on Afric's shore of doom!" His account of the Congo was discussed at length by Arthur Conan Doyle in his pamphlet The Crime of the Congo (1909), and quoted by W. E. B. Du Bois in his memoir Darkwater (1920), amongst others. Edmund Dene Morel also used Glave's journalistic writings in pamphlets made for the Congo Reform Association, which promoted reform of the atrocious conditions enacted on native Africans in the Congo Free State

== Publications ==
- In savage Africa; or, Six years of adventure in Congo-land, 1892
- "Life in the Wilds of Central Africa", in Journal of the American Geographical Society, January 1893
- Articles in Frank Leslie's Illustrated Newspaper
- Articles in The Century Magazine
- Glave, Edward J. (2013). Travels to the Alseck: Edward Glave’s reports from southwest Yukon and southeast Alaska, 1890-91. Yukon Native Language Centre. ISBN 978-1-55242-368-4, at, https://www.researchgate.net/profile/Doug-Hitch/publication/320280460_Travels_to_the_Alseck_Edward_Glave's_reports_from_southwest_Yukon_and_southeast_Alaska_1890-91/links/6372db0954eb5f547cd3afe3/Travels-to-the-Alseck-Edward-Glaves-reports-from-southwest-Yukon-and-southeast-Alaska-1890-91.pdf (Jan. 28, 2025).
