= Proclamation of the Congo Free State =

The Congo Free State was a state in Africa created and headed by the former Belgian monarch, Leopold II as a personal union with Belgium. On 29 May 1885, after the closure of the Berlin Conference, the king announced that he planned to name his possessions "the Congo Free State", an appellation which was not yet used at the Berlin Conference and which officially replaced "International Association of the Congo" on 1 August 1885.

== Establishment ==
The Belgian legislative chambers, in a resolution passed by the House of Representatives on April 28, 1885, and by the Senate on April 30, had authorized Leopold II to become head of another state: "His Majesty Leopold II, King of the Belgians, is authorized to be the head of the state founded in Africa by the International Association of the Congo. The union between Belgium and the new state will be exclusively personal ", "personal" meaning that, "as far as the Belgian government is concerned, what Leopold II does in Africa, he does as a private individual as in a personal union. The government had no business getting involved. And in fact, except for a few rare moments, the King will not even keep his ministers informed of the development of his enterprise". On April 30, 1885, Leopold II assumed the title of sovereign of the independent state of Congo.

=== Aftermath of the establishment ===
It was an Englishman, Sir Francis de Winton, vice-administrator general of the Association Internationale du Congo, who officially proclaimed the foundation of the Independent State of Congo in Vivi on July 1, 1885, and the accession of Leopold II as its sovereign. On April 1, 1886, Winton completed his mandate and returned to England, where he was hired by the British East African Association. The capital was later transferred to Boma.
