= The Crime of the Congo =

1909 book by Arthur Conan Doyle

- First edition (PDF)
- Author: Sir Arthur Conan Doyle
- Language: English
- Subject: Congo Free State
- Published: London
- Publisher: Hutchinson & Co
- Publication date: 1909
- Publication place: United Kingdom

The Crime of the Congo is a 1909 book by British writer and physician Sir Arthur Conan Doyle, about human rights abuses in the Congo Free State, a private state established and controlled by the King of the Belgians, Leopold II.

== Synopsis ==
The book was intended as an exposé of the situation in the so-called Congo Free State (labelled a "rubber regime" by Conan Doyle), an area occupied and designated as the personal property of Leopold II of Belgium and where the serious human rights abuses were occurring. Indigenous people in the region were being brutally exploited and tortured, particularly in the lucrative rubber trade. In the introduction to The Crime of the Congo Conan Doyle wrote: "I am convinced that the reason why public opinion has not been more sensitive upon the question of the Congo Free State is that the terrible story has not been brought thoroughly home to the people", a situation he intended to rectify. Conan Doyle was "strongly of the opinion" that the crimes committed on the Congo were "the greatest to be ever known", and he lauded the work of the Congo Reform Association. Conan Doyle was dismissive of the annexation of the state by Belgium, a situation intended to end the personal rule of the King. Conan Doyle noted that slavery and ivory poaching continued to occur after annexation and that "The Congo State was founded by the Belgian King, and exploited by Belgian capital, Belgian soldiers and Belgian concessionnaires. It was defended and upheld by successive Belgian Governments, who did all they could to discourage the Reformers".

== Reception ==
In the Daily Express the book was praised as "the most powerful indictment yet launched against the Belgian rulers of this bloodstained colony". The Express also noted that "after reviewing the early history of the Congo Free State Sir Arthur quotes the testimony of many unimpeachable witnesses regarding the brutalities of the 'rubber system' and the coldblooded mutilation and massacre of natives during the past fifteen years".

== Aftermath ==
Many academics who have analysed Conan Doyle's life have noted his activism, including his authorship of The Crime of the Congo. In 2009, Cambridge Scholars Publishing released a reprint of the work, in Collected Works of Sir Arthur Conan Doyle.

== See also ==
- Heart of Darkness – 1899 novella by Joseph Conrad inspired by the Congo Free State atrocities
