= Congo Free State =

Territory in Central Africa (1885–1908)

Congo Free State: État indépendant du Congo (French); Onafhankelijke Congostaat (Dutch)
- 1885–1908
- Flag Coat of arms
- Motto: Travail et progrès (French); Werk en voortgang (Dutch) ("Work and Progress")
- Anthem: Vers l'avenir (English: "Towards The Future")
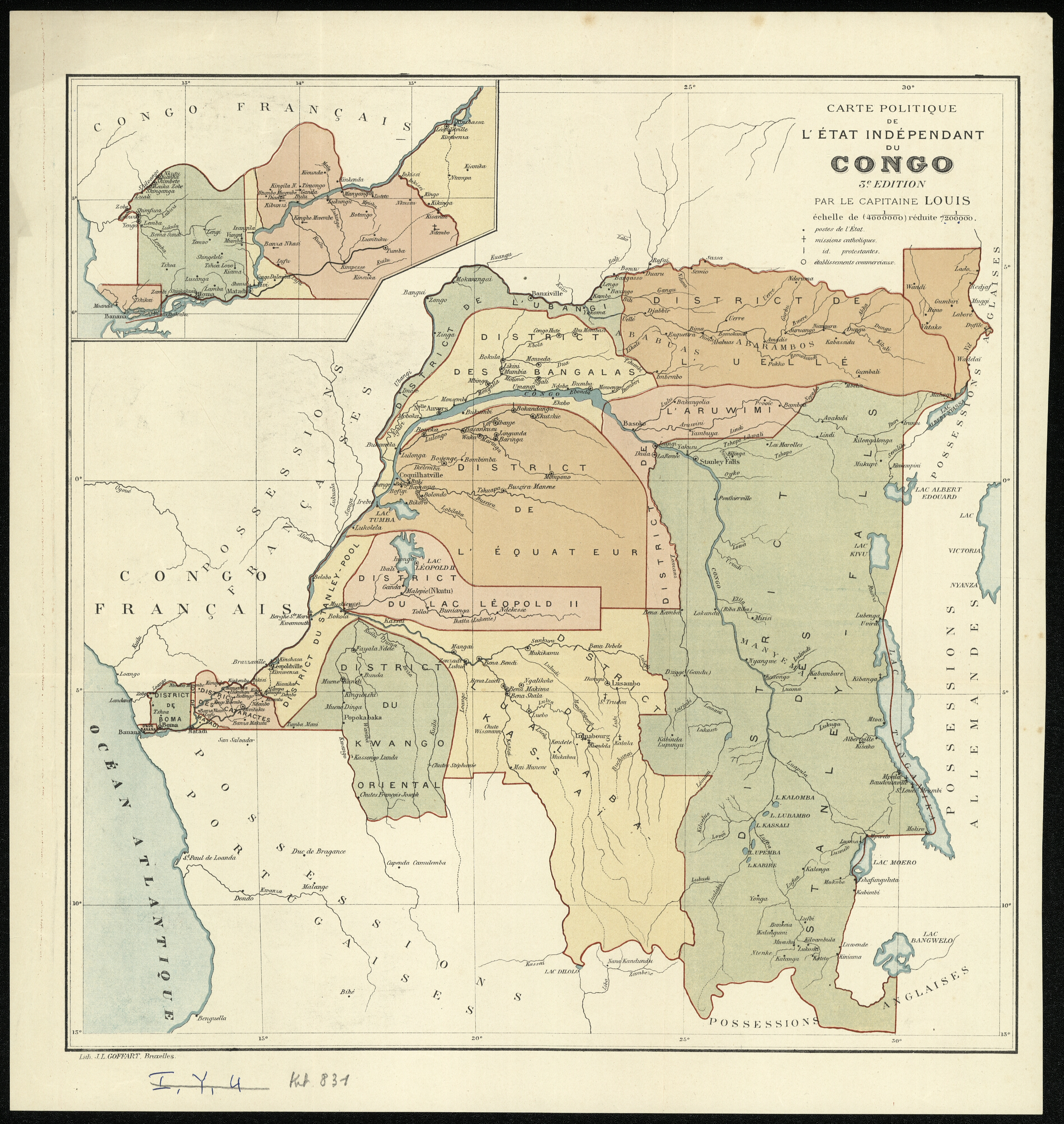
- Non-dated (though from 1894 at the earliest, due to the existence of the Lado Enclave) French-language map of the Congo Free State and its subdivisions. The map overestimates Lake Bangwelu's size, which in reality does not come into contact with the "Congo Pedicle".
- Status: Sovereign state in personal union with Belgium
- Capital: Vivi (1885–1886); Boma (1886–1908); 05°51′17″S 13°03′24″E
- Common languages: French (de facto official); Dutch; more than 200 indigenous languages
- Religion: Catholicism (de facto)
- Government: Absolute monarchy
- Sovereign
  - 1885–1908: Leopold II of Belgium
- Governor-General
  - 1885–1886 (first): F. W. de Winton
  - 1900–1908 (last): Théophile Wahis
- Historical era: New Imperialism
  - Established: 1 July 1885
  - Congo Arab war: 1892–1894
  - Battle of Rejaf: 1897
  - Annexed by Belgium: 15 November 1908

Area
  - Total: 2,345,409 km^{2} (905,567 sq mi)
  - Water: 77,867 km^{2} (30,065 sq mi)
  - Water (%): 3.32

Population
  - 1907 estimate: 9,130,000
  - Density: 3.8/km^{2} (9.8/sq mi)
- Currency: Congolese franc (1887–1908)
Preceded by
International Association of the Congo
Luba Empire
Chokwe Kingdom
Yeke Kingdom
Tippu Tip's state
Mwene Muji
Boma Kingdom
Tio Kingdom
Succeeded by
Belgian Congo
- Today part of: Democratic Republic of the Congo

The Congo Free State (CFS), also known as the Independent State of the Congo (French: État indépendant du Congo), was a state and absolute monarchy in Central Africa from 1885 to 1908. It was privately owned by King Leopold II, the constitutional monarch of the Kingdom of Belgium. In legal terms, the two separate countries were in a personal union. The Congo Free State was not a part of, nor did it belong to, Belgium. Leopold was able to seize the region by convincing other European states at the Berlin Conference on Africa that he was involved in humanitarian and philanthropic work and would not tax trade. Via the International Association of the Congo, he was able to lay claim to most of the Congo Basin. On 29 May 1885, after the closure of the Berlin Conference, the king announced that he planned to name his possessions "the Congo Free State", an appellation which was not yet used at the Berlin Conference and which officially replaced "International Association of the Congo" on 1 August 1885. The Free State was privately controlled by Leopold from Brussels; he never visited it.

The state included the entire area of the present Democratic Republic of the Congo and existed from 1885 to 1908, when the Belgian Parliament reluctantly annexed the state as a colony belonging to Belgium after international pressure.

Leopold's reign in the Congo eventually earned infamy on account of the atrocities perpetrated on the Indigenous people. Ostensibly, the Congo Free State aimed to bring civilization to the locals and to develop the region economically. In reality, Leopold II's administration extracted ivory, rubber, and minerals from the upper Congo Basin for sale on the world market through a series of international concessionary companies that brought little benefit to the area. Under Leopold's administration, the Free State became one of the greatest international scandals of the early 20th century. The Casement Report of the British Consul Roger Casement led to the arrest and punishment of officials who had been responsible for killings during a rubber-collecting expedition in 1903.

The loss of life and atrocities inspired literature such as Joseph Conrad's novel Heart of Darkness and raised an international outcry. Debate has been ongoing about the high death rate in this period. The highest estimates state that the widespread use of forced labour, torture, and murder led to the deaths of 50 per cent of the population in the rubber provinces. The lack of accurate records makes it difficult to quantify the number of deaths caused by the exploitation and the lack of immunity to new diseases introduced by contact with European colonists. During the Congo Free State propaganda war, European and US reformers exposed atrocities in the Congo Free State to the public through the Congo Reform Association (CRA), founded by Casement and the journalist, author, and politician E. D. Morel. Also active in exposing the activities of the Congo Free State was the author Arthur Conan Doyle, whose book The Crime of the Congo was widely read in the early 1900s.

By 1908, public pressure and diplomatic manoeuvres led to the end of Leopold II's absolutist rule; the Belgian Parliament annexed the Congo Free State as a colony of Belgium. It became known thereafter as the Belgian Congo. In addition, a number of major Belgian investment companies pushed the Belgian government to take over the Congo and develop the mining sector as it was virtually untapped.

== Background ==
=== Early European exploration ===
Diogo Cão travelled around the mouth of the Congo River in 1482, leading Portugal to claim the region. Until the middle of the 19th century, the Congo was at the heart of independent Africa, as European colonialists seldom entered the interior. Along with fierce local resistance, the rainforest, swamps, malaria, sleeping sickness, and other diseases made it a difficult environment for Europeans to settle. Western states were at first reluctant to colonize the area in the absence of obvious economic benefits.

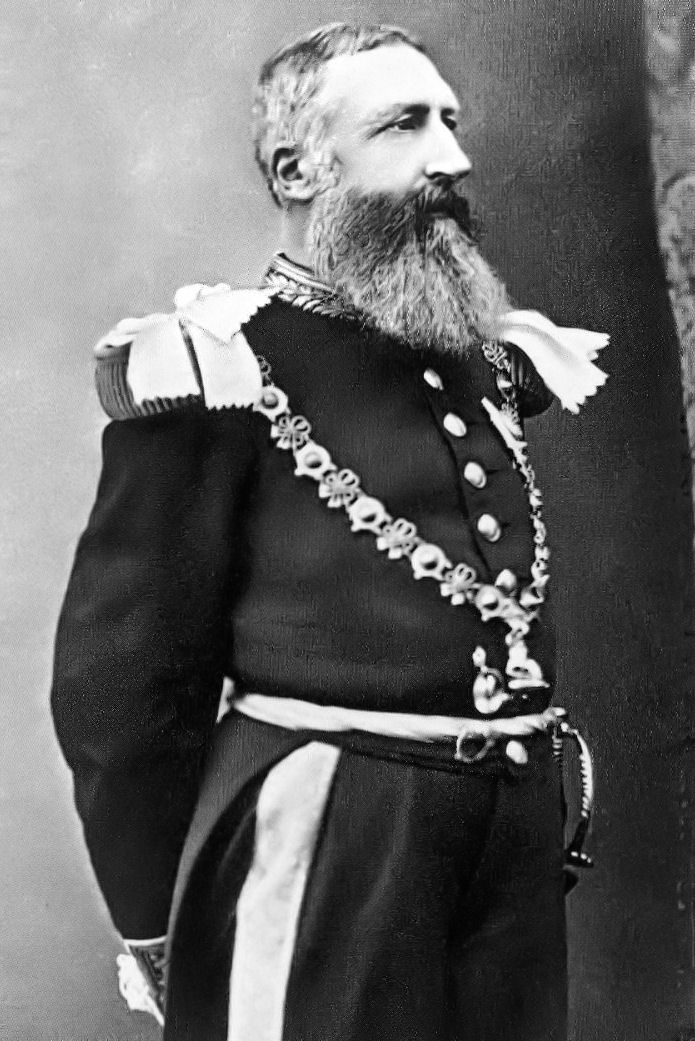
Leopold II, King of the Belgians and de facto owner of the Congo Free State from 1885 to 1908

=== Stanley's exploration ===
In 1876, Leopold II of Belgium hosted the Brussels Geographic Conference, inviting famous explorers, philanthropists, and members of geographic societies to stir up interest in a "humanitarian" endeavour for Europeans in central Africa to "improve" and "civilize" the lives of the Indigenous peoples. At the conference, Leopold organized the International African Association with the cooperation of European and US explorers and the support of several European governments, and was himself elected chairman. Leopold used the association to promote plans to seize independent central Africa under this philanthropic guise.

Henry Morton Stanley, famous for making contact with British missionary David Livingstone in Africa in 1871, explored the region in 1876–1877, a journey that was described in Stanley's 1878 book Through the Dark Continent. Failing to enlist British interest in the Congo region, Stanley took up service with Leopold II, who hired him to help gain a foothold in the region and annex the region for himself.

From August 1879 to June 1884 Stanley was in the Congo Basin, where he built a road from the lower Congo up to Stanley Pool and launched steamers on the upper river. While exploring the Congo for Leopold, Stanley set up treaties with the local chiefs and local leaders. In essence, the documents gave over all rights of their respective pieces of land to Leopold. With Stanley's help, Leopold was able to claim a great area along the Congo River, and military posts were established.

Christian de Bonchamps, a French explorer who served Leopold in Katanga, expressed attitudes towards such treaties shared by many Europeans, saying:

The treaties with these little African tyrants, which generally consist of four long pages of which they do not understand a word, and to which they sign a cross in order to have peace and to receive gifts, are really only serious matters for the European powers, in the event of disputes over the territories. They do not concern the black sovereign who signs them for a moment.

=== King Leopold's campaign ===
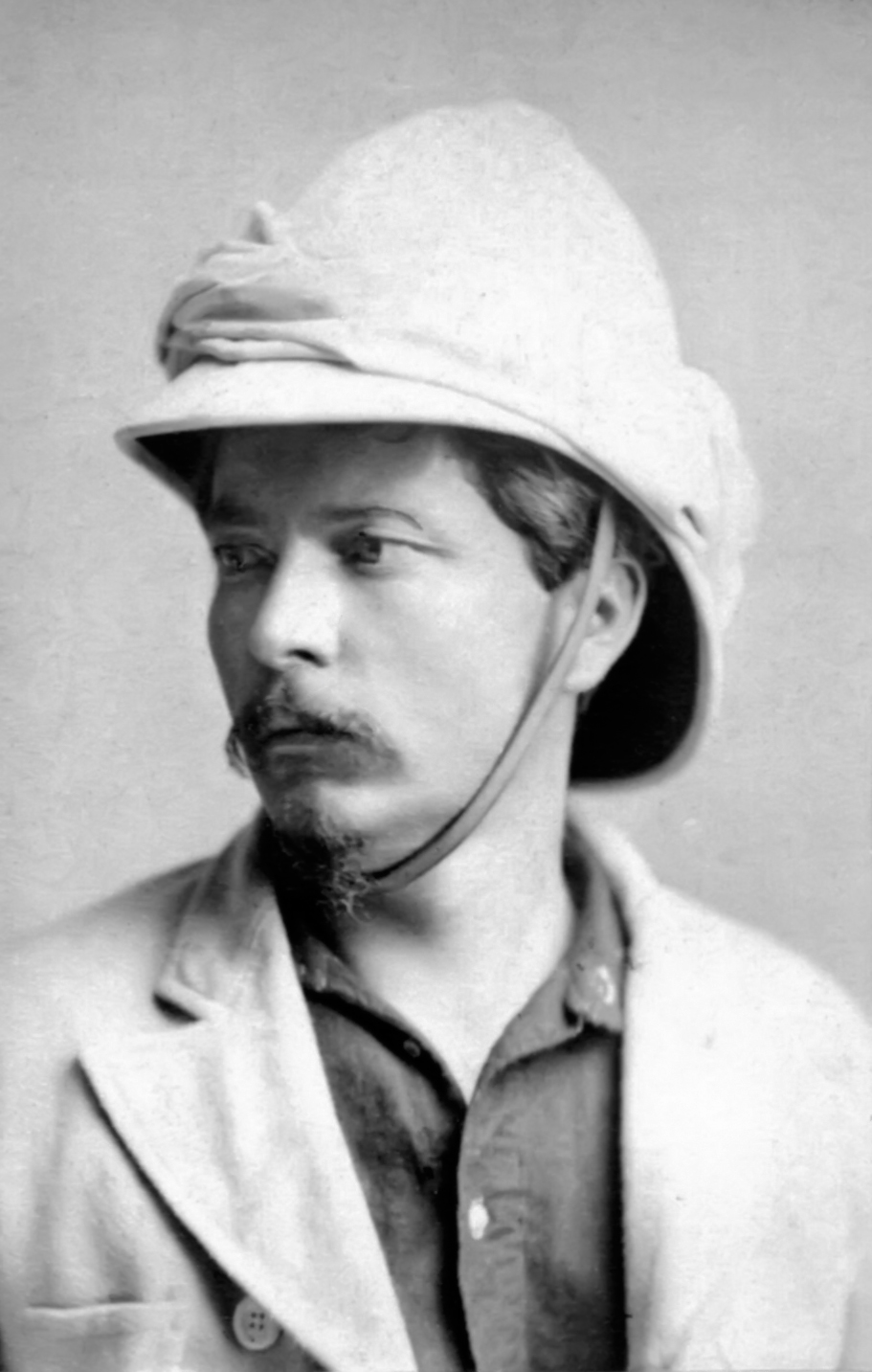
Henry Morton Stanley, whose exploration of the Congo region at Leopold's invitation led to the establishment of the Congo Free State under personal sovereignty

Leopold began to create a plan to convince other European powers of the legitimacy of his claim to the region, all the while maintaining the guise that his work was for the benefit of the Indigenous people under the name of a philanthropic "association".

The king launched a publicity campaign in Britain to distract critics, drawing attention to Portugal's record of slavery, and offering to drive slave traders from the Congo Basin. He also secretly told British merchant houses that if he was given formal control of the Congo for this and other humanitarian purposes, he would then give them the same most favoured nation (MFN) status Portugal had offered them. At the same time, Leopold promised Bismarck he would not give any one nation special status, and that German traders would be as welcome as any other.

"I do not want to risk ... losing a fine chance to secure for ourselves a slice of this magnificent African cake."

— King Leopold II, to an aide in London

Leopold then offered France the support of the association for French ownership of the entire northern bank of the Congo, and sweetened the deal by proposing that, if his personal wealth proved insufficient to hold the entire Congo, as seemed utterly inevitable, that it should revert to France. On 23 April 1884, the International Association's claim on the southern Congo Basin was formally recognized by France on condition that the French got the first option to buy the territory if the Association decided to sell. This may also have helped Leopold to gain recognition for his claim by the other major powers, who thus wanted him to succeed instead of selling his claims to France.

He also enlisted the aid of the United States, sending President Chester A. Arthur carefully edited copies of the cloth-and-trinket treaties that Stanley (a Welsh-American) claimed to have negotiated with various local authorities, and proposing that, as an entirely disinterested humanitarian body, the Association would administer the Congo for the good of all, handing over power to the natives as soon as they were ready for that responsibility.

Leopold wanted to have the United States support his plans for the Congo in order to gain support from the European nations. He had help from US businessman Henry Shelton Sanford, who had recruited Stanley for Leopold. Henry Sanford swayed President Arthur by inviting him to stay as his guest at Sanford House hotel on Lake Monroe while he was in Belgium. On 29 November 1883, during his meeting with the President, as Leopold's envoy, he convinced the President that Leopold's agenda was similar to the US' involvement in Liberia. This satisfied Southern US politicians and businessmen, especially Alabama Senator John Tyler Morgan.

Morgan saw Congo as the same opportunity to send freedmen to Africa so they could contribute to and build the cotton market. Sanford also convinced the people in New York that they were going to abolish slavery and aid travellers and scientists in order to have the public's support. After Henry's actions in convincing President Arthur, the United States was the first country to recognize Congo as a legitimate sovereign state. The United States further participated in the process of recognition by sending the US Navy Congo River Expedition of 1885, which gave a detailed description of travel along the river.

=== Lobbying and claiming the region ===
Leopold was able to attract scientific and humanitarian backing for the International African Association (French: Association internationale africaine, or AIA), which he formed during a Brussels Geographic Conference of geographic societies, explorers, and dignitaries he hosted in 1876. At the conference, Leopold proposed establishing an international benevolent committee for the propagation of civilization among the peoples of central Africa (the Congo region). The AIA was originally conceived as a multi-national, scientific, and humanitarian assembly, and even invited Gustave Moynier as member of the International Law Institute and president of the International Committee of the Red Cross to attend their 1877 conference. The International Law Institute was supportive of the project under the belief that it was aimed to abolish the Congo Basin slave trade. Nevertheless, the AIA eventually became a development company controlled by Leopold.

After 1879 and the crumbling of the International African Association, Leopold's work was done under the auspices of the "Committee for Studies of the Upper Congo" (French: Comité d'Études du Haut-Congo). The committee, supposedly an international commercial, scientific, and humanitarian group, was in fact made of a group of businessmen who had shares in the Congo, with Leopold holding a large block by proxy. The committee itself eventually disintegrated, but Leopold continued to refer to it and use the defunct organization as a smokescreen for his operations in laying claim to the Congo region.

"Belgium does not need a colony. Belgians are not drawn towards overseas enterprises: they prefer to spend their energy and capital in countries which have already been explored or on less risky schemes ... Still, you can assure His Majesty of my whole-hearted sympathy for the generous plan he had conceived, as long as the Congo does not make any international difficulties for us."

— Walthère Frère-Orban, Liberal Prime Minister of Belgium, 1878–84.

Determined to look for a colony for himself and inspired by recent reports from central Africa, Leopold began patronizing a number of leading explorers, including Henry Morton Stanley. Leopold established the International African Association, a charitable organization to oversee the exploration and surveying of a territory based around the Congo River, with the stated goal of bringing humanitarian assistance and civilization to the natives. In the Berlin Conference of 1884–85, European leaders officially noted Leopold's control over the 2,600,000 km^{2} (1,000,000 sq mi) of the notionally independent Congo Free State.

To give his African operations a name that could serve for a political entity, Leopold created, between 1879 and 1882, the International Association of the Congo (French: Association internationale du Congo, or AIC) as a new umbrella organization. This organization sought to combine the numerous small territories acquired into one sovereign state and asked for recognition from the European powers. On 22 April 1884, thanks to the successful lobbying of businessman Henry Shelton Sanford at Leopold's request, President Chester A. Arthur of the United States decided that the cessions claimed by Leopold from the local leaders were lawful and recognized the International Association of the Congo's claim on the region, becoming the first country to do so. In 1884, the US Secretary of State said, "The Government of the United States announces its sympathy with and approval of the humane and benevolent purposes of the International Association of the Congo."

=== Berlin Conference ===
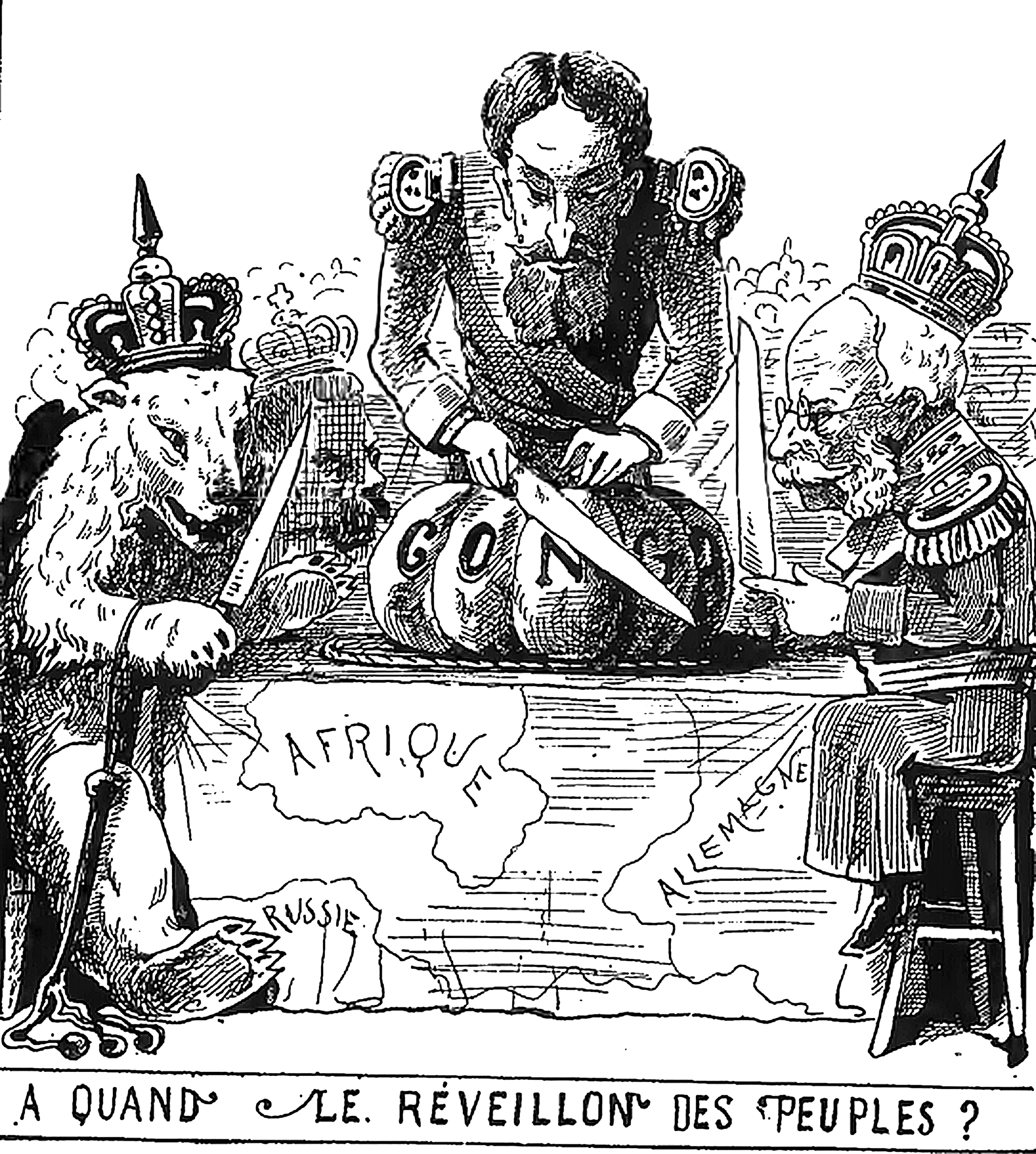
A cartoon depicting Leopold II in the middle, German Emperor William I on the right and the Russian Empire on the left, at the 1884 Berlin Conference

In November 1884, Otto von Bismarck convened a 14-nation conference to submit the Congo question to international control and to finalize the colonial partitioning of the African continent. Most major powers (including Austria-Hungary, Belgium, France, Germany, Portugal, Italy, the United Kingdom, Russia, the Ottoman Empire, and the United States) attended the Berlin Conference, and drafted an international code governing the way that European countries should behave as they acquired African territory. The conference officially recognized the International Congo Association, and specified that it should have no connection with Belgium, beyond a personal union, or any other country, but would be under the personal control of King Leopold.

It drew specific boundaries and specified that all nations should have access to do business in the Congo with no tariffs. The slave trade would be suppressed. In 1885, Leopold emerged triumphant. France was given 666,000 km^{2} (257,000 sq mi) on the north bank (the modern Congo-Brazzaville and Central African Republic), Portugal 909,000 km^{2} (351,000 sq mi) to the south (modern Angola), and Leopold's personal organization received the balance: 2,344,000 km^{2} (905,000 sq mi), with about 30 million people. However, it still remained for these territories to be occupied under the conference's "Principle of Effective Occupation".

=== International recognition ===
Following the United States' recognition of Leopold's colony, other Western powers deliberated on the news. Portugal flirted with the French at first, but the British offered to support Portugal's claim to the entire Congo in return for a free trade agreement and to spite their French rivals. Britain was uneasy at French expansion and had a technical claim on the Congo via Lieutenant Cameron's 1873 expedition from Zanzibar to bring home Livingstone's body, but was reluctant to take on yet another expensive, unproductive colony. Bismarck of Germany had vast new holdings in southwest Africa, and had no plans for the Congo, but was happy to see rivals Britain and France excluded from the colony.

In 1885, Leopold's efforts to establish Belgian influence in the Congo Basin were awarded with the État Indépendant du Congo (CFS, Congo Free State). By a resolution passed in the Belgian Parliament, Leopold became roi souverain ('sovereign king'), of the newly formed CFS, over which he enjoyed nearly absolute control. The CFS (today the Democratic Republic of the Congo), a country of over two million square kilometres, became Leopold's personal property, the Domaine Privé. Eventually, the Congo Free State was recognized as a neutral independent sovereignty by various European and North US states.

== Government ==
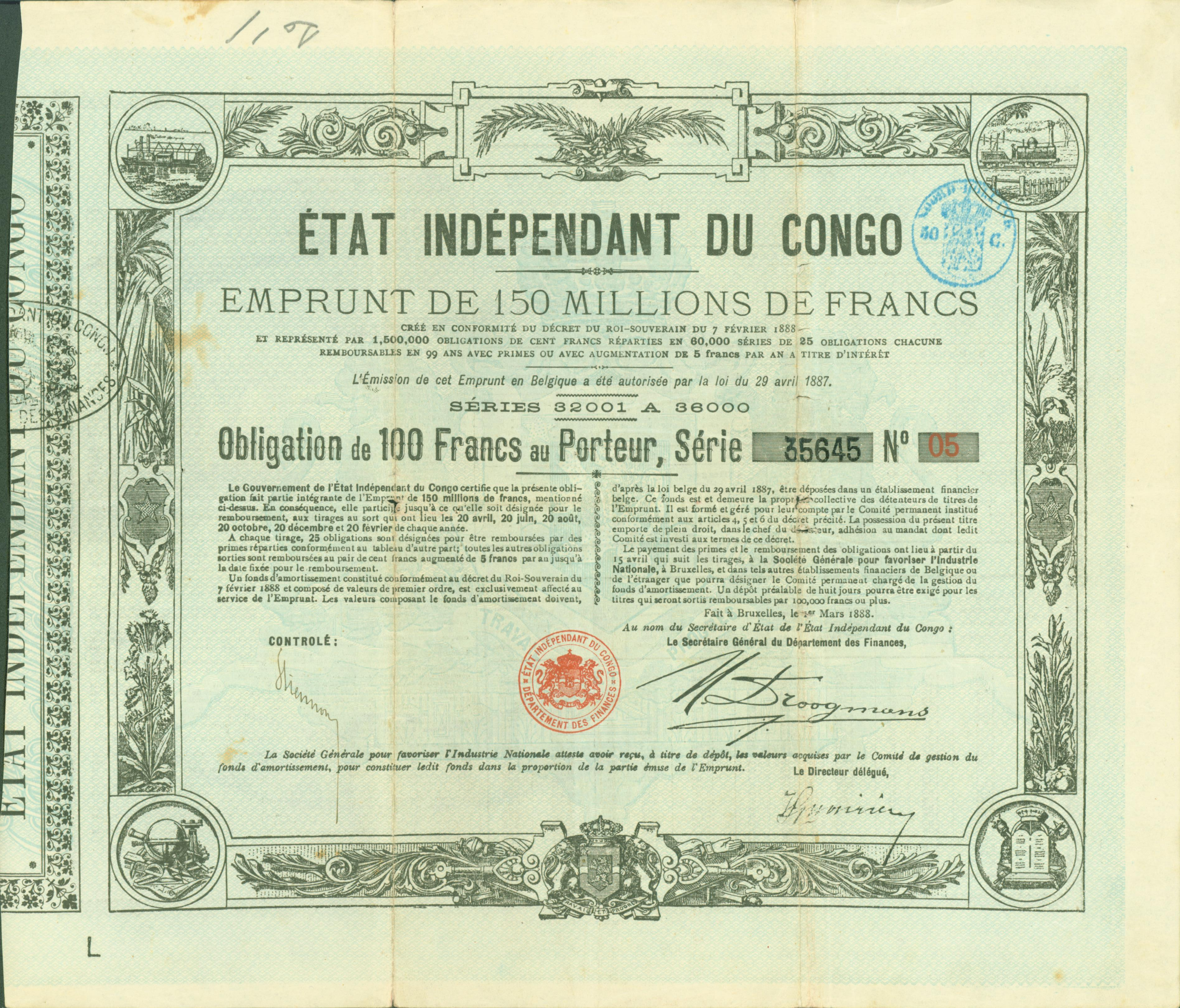
A bond of the Congo Free State, issued March 1888

Leopold used the title 'Sovereign of the Congo Free State' as ruler of the Congo Free State (CFS). He appointed the heads of the three departments of state: interior, foreign affairs and finances. Each was headed by an administrator-general (administrateur-général), later a secretary-general (secrétaire-général), who was obligated to enact the policies of the sovereign or else resign. Below the secretaries-general were a series of bureaucrats of decreasing rank: directors general (directeurs généraux), directors (directeurs), division chiefs (chefs de divisions) and bureau chiefs (chefs de bureaux). The departments were headquartered in Brussels.

Finance was in charge of accounting for income and expenditure and tracking the public debt. Besides diplomacy, foreign affairs was in charge of shipping, education, religion and commerce. The department of the interior was responsible for defence, police, public health and public works. It was also charged with overseeing the exploitation of the Congo's natural resources and plantations. In 1904, the secretary-general of the interior set up a propaganda office, the Bureau central de la presse ("Central Press Bureau"), in Frankfurt under the auspices of the Comité pour la représentation des intérêts coloniaux en Afrique (German: Komitee zur Wahrung der kolonialen Interessen in Afrika, lit. 'Committee for the Representation of Colonial Interests in Africa').

The oversight of all the departments was nominally in the hands of the Governor-General (Gouverneur général), but this office was at times more honorary than real. When the governor-general was in Belgium he was represented in the Congo by a vice governor-general (vice-gouverneur général), who was nominally equal in rank to a secretary-general but in fact was beneath them in power and influence. A consultative committee (Comité consultatif) made up of civil servants was set up in 1887 to assist the governor-general, but he was not obliged to consult it. The vice governor-general on the ground had a state secretary through whom he communicated with his district officers.

The Free State had an independent judiciary headed by a minister of justice at Boma. The minister was equal in rank to the vice governor-general and initially answered to the governor-general, but was eventually made responsible to the sovereign alone. There was a supreme court composed of three judges, which heard appeals, and below it a high court of one judge. These sat at Boma. In addition to these, there were district courts and public prosecutors (procureurs d'état). Justice, however, was slow and the system ill-suited to a frontier society.

== Leopold's rule ==
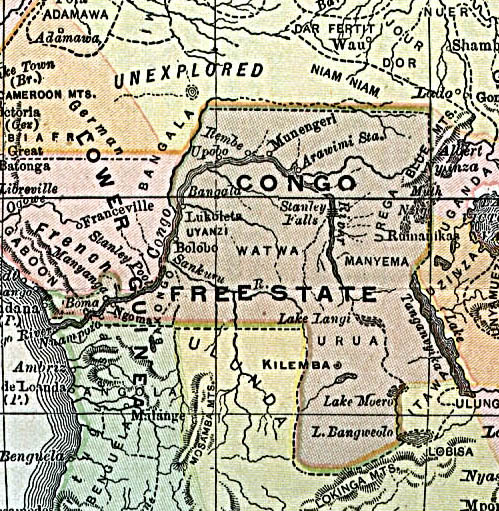
A map of the Congo Free State in 1892

Leopold no longer needed the façade of the association, and replaced it with an appointed cabinet of Belgians who would do his bidding. To the temporary new capital of Boma, he sent a governor-general and a chief of police. The vast Congo Basin was split up into 14 administrative districts, each district into zones, each zone into sectors, and each sector into posts. From the district commissioners down to post level, every appointed head was European. With little financial means, the Free State mainly relied on local elites to rule and tax the vast and hard-to-reach Congolese interior.

In the Free State, Leopold exercised total personal control without much delegation to subordinates. African chiefs played an important role in the administration by implementing government orders within their communities. Throughout much of its existence, Free State presence in the territory that it claimed was patchy, with its few officials concentrated in a number of small and widely dispersed "stations" which controlled only small amounts of hinterland. In 1900, there were just 3,000 Europeans in the Congo, of whom only half were Belgian. The colony was perpetually short of administrative staff and officials, who numbered between 700 and 1,500 during the period.

Leopold pledged to suppress the east African slave trade; promote humanitarian policies; guarantee free trade within the colony; impose no import duties for twenty years; and encourage philanthropic and scientific enterprises. Beginning in the mid-1880s, Leopold first decreed that the state asserted rights of proprietorship over all vacant lands throughout the Congo territory. In three successive decrees, Leopold promised the rights of the Congolese in their land to local villages and farms, essentially making nearly all of the CFS terres domaniales, 'state-owned land'. Leopold further decreed that merchants should limit their commercial operations in rubber trade with the locals. Additionally, the colonial administration liberated thousands of slaves.

Four main problems presented themselves over the next few years.

1. Leopold II ran up huge debts to finance his colonial endeavour and risked losing his colony to Belgium.
2. Much of the Free State was unmapped jungle, which offered little fiscal and commercial return.
3. Cecil Rhodes, Prime Minister of the Cape Colony (part of modern South Africa), was expanding his British South Africa Company's charter lands from the south and threatened to occupy Katanga (southern Congo) by exploiting the "Principle of Effectivity" loophole in the Berlin Treaty. In this he was supported by Harry Johnston, the British Commissioner for Central Africa, who was London's representative in the region.
4. The Congolese interior was ruled by Arab Zanzibari slavers and sultans, powerful kings and warlords who had to be coerced or defeated by use of force. For example, the slaving gangs of Zanzibar trader Tippu Tip had a strong presence in the eastern part of the territory in the modern-day Maniema, Tanganyika and Ituri regions. They were linked to the Swahili coast via Uganda and Tanzania and had established independent slave states.

=== Early economy and concessions ===
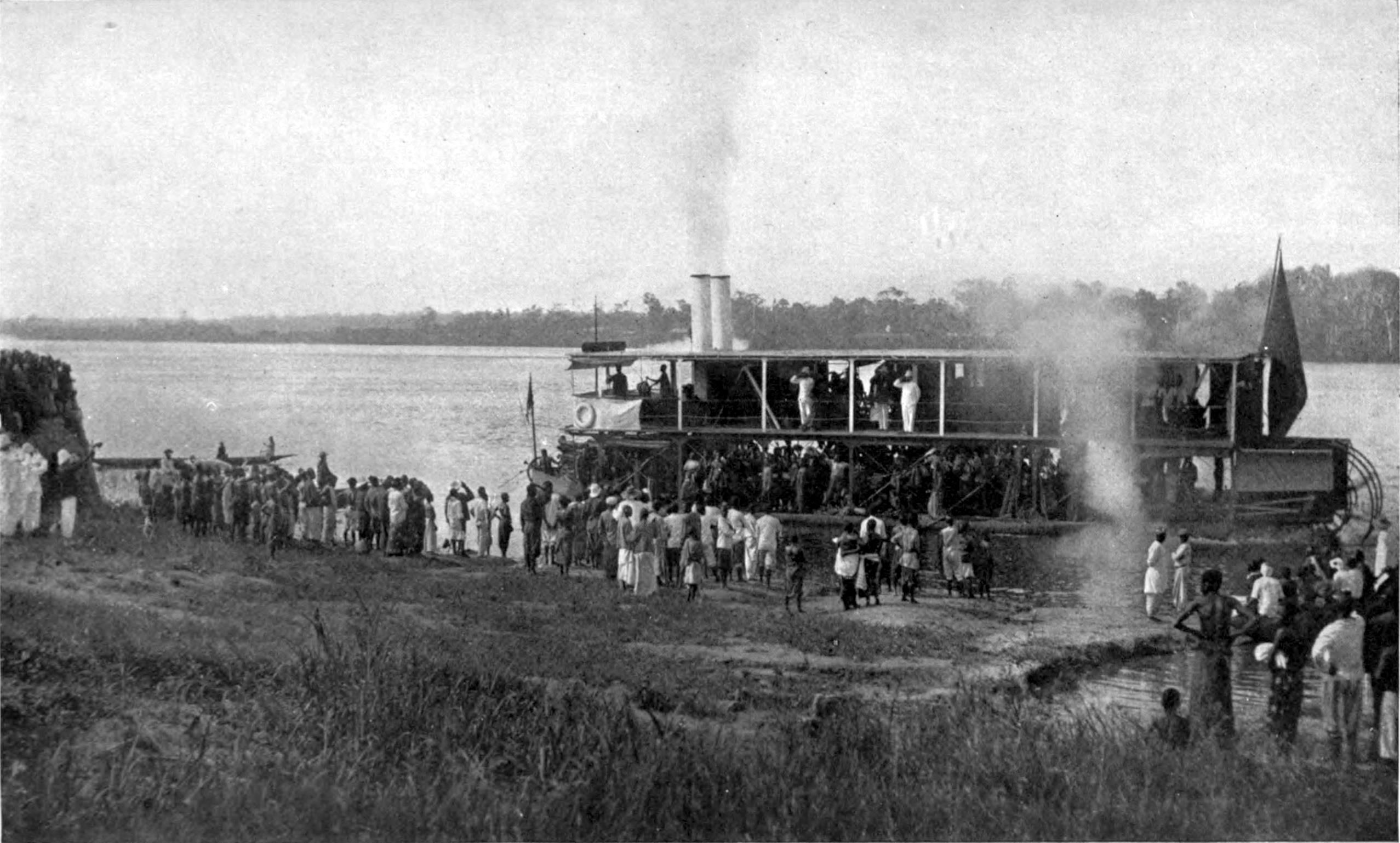
A steamboat at Stanleyville (Kisangani) in the Congo Free State, 1899

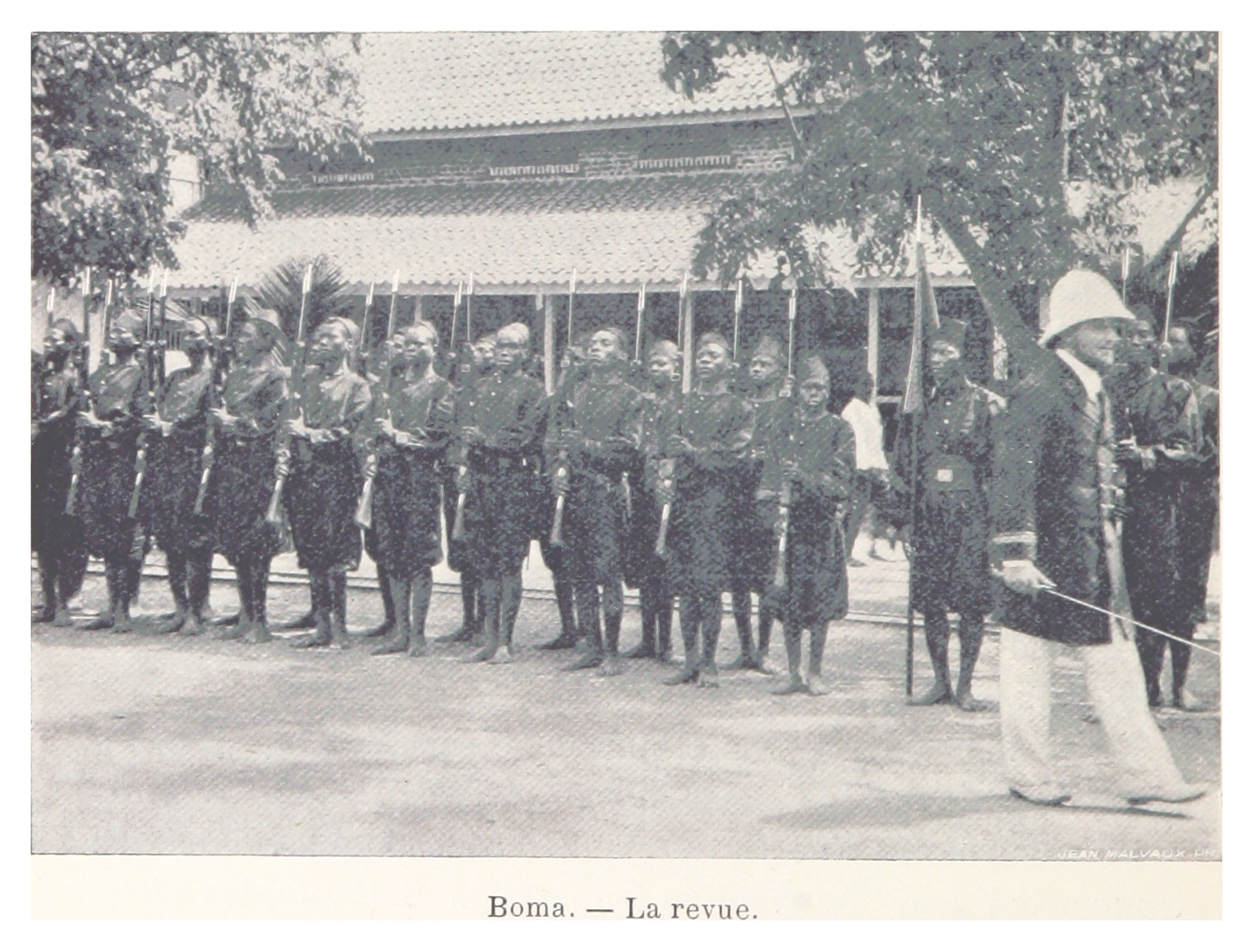
'La revue' of the Force Publique, Boma, capital city of the Congo Free State, 1899

Leopold could not meet the costs of running the Congo Free State. Desperately, he set in motion a system to maximize revenue. The first change was the introduction of the concept of terres vacantes, 'vacant land', which was any land that did not contain a habitation or a cultivated garden plot. All of this land (i.e., most of the country) was therefore deemed to belong to the state. Servants of the state (namely any men in Leopold's employ) were encouraged to exploit it.

Shortly after the Brussels Anti-Slavery Conference (1889–1890), Leopold issued a new decree mandating that Africans in a large part of the Free State could sell their harvested products (mostly ivory and rubber) only to the state. This law extended an earlier decree declaring that all "unoccupied" land belonged to the state. Any ivory or rubber collected from the state-owned land, the reasoning went, must belong to the state, thus creating a de facto state-controlled monopoly. Therefore, a large share of the local population could sell only to the state, which could set prices and thereby control the income the Congolese could receive for their work. For local elites, however, this system presented new opportunities, as the Free State and concession companies paid them with guns to tax their subjects in kind.

Trading companies began to lose out to the Free State government, which not only paid no taxes but also collected all the potential income. These companies were outraged by the restrictions on free trade, which the Berlin Act had so carefully protected years before. Their protests against the violation of free trade prompted Leopold to take another, less obvious tack to make money.

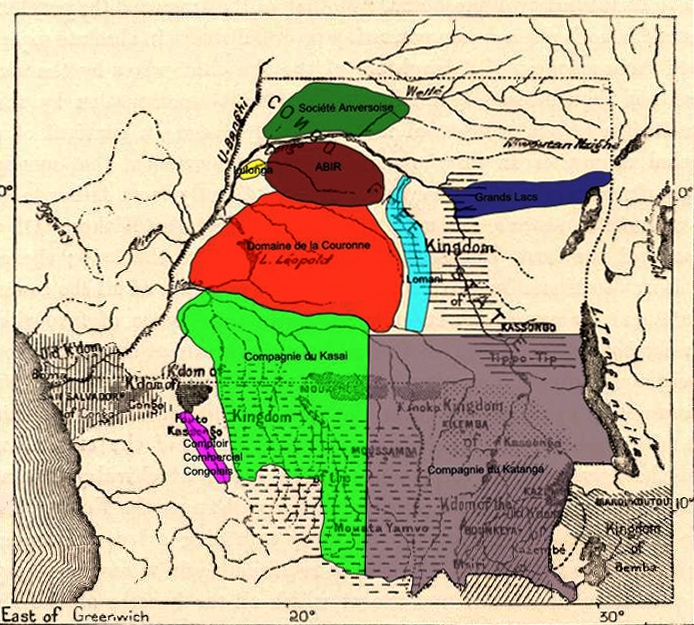
The concessions and the Domaine de la Couronne. The infamous A.B.I.R. company is shown in dark red.

A decree in 1892 divided the terres vacantes into a domainal system that privatized extraction rights over rubber for the state in certain private domains, allowing Leopold to grant vast concessions to private companies. In other areas, private companies could continue to trade but were highly restricted and taxed. The domainal system enforced an in-kind tax on the Free State's Congolese subjects. As essential intermediaries, local rulers forced their men, women and children to collect rubber, ivory and foodstuffs. Depending on the power of local rulers, the Free State paid prices below the rising market prices.

In October 1892, Leopold granted concessions to a number of companies. Each company was given a large amount of land in the Congo Free State on which to collect rubber and ivory for sale in Europe. These companies were allowed to detain Africans who did not work hard enough, to police their vast areas as they saw fit and to take all the products of the forest for themselves. In return for their concessions, these companies paid an annual dividend to the Free State. At the height of the rubber boom, from 1901 until 1906, these dividends also filled the royal coffers.

The Free Trade Zone in the Congo was open to entrepreneurs of any European nation, who were allowed to buy 10- and 15-year monopoly leases on anything of value: ivory from a district or the rubber concession, for example. The other zone—almost two-thirds of the Congo—became the Domaine Privé, 'exclusive private property of the state'.

In 1893, Leopold excised the most readily accessible 259,000 km^{2} (100,000 sq mi) portion of the Free Trade Zone and declared it to be the Domaine de la Couronne, 'fief of the crown'. Rubber revenue went directly to Leopold who paid the Free State for the high costs of exploitation. The same rules applied as in the Domaine Privé. In 1896 global demand for rubber soared. From that year onwards, the Congolese rubber sector started to generate vast sums of money at an immense cost for the local population.

=== Scramble for Katanga ===
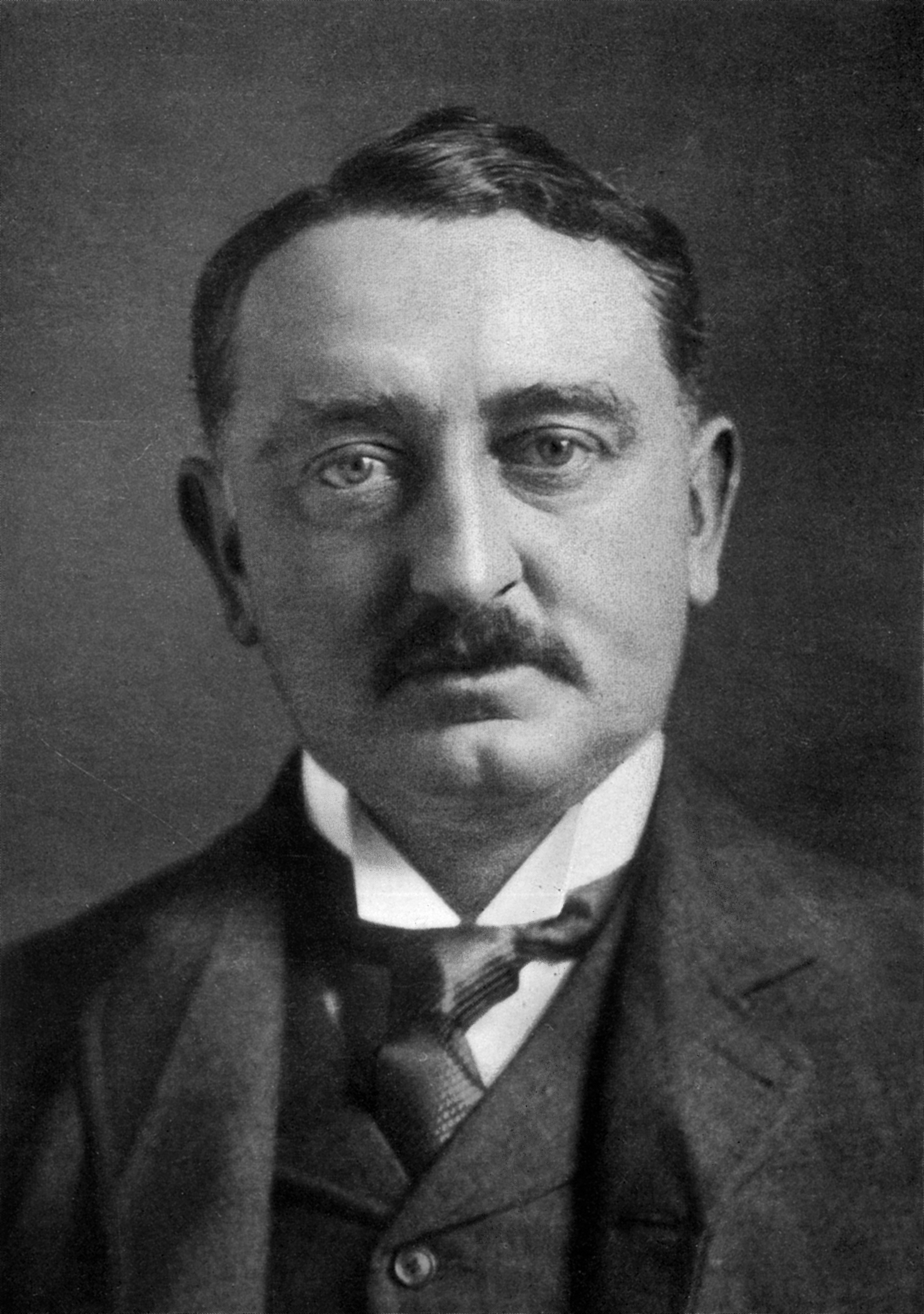
Cecil Rhodes attempted to expand the territory of the British South Africa Company northward into the Congo Basin, presenting a problem for Leopold II

Early in Leopold's rule, the second problem—the British South Africa Company's expansion into the southern Congo Basin—was addressed. The distant Yeke Kingdom, in Katanga on the upper Lualaba River, had signed no treaties, was known to be rich in copper and thought to have much gold from its slave-trading activities. Its powerful mwami ('King'), Msiri, had already rejected a treaty brought by Alfred Sharpe on behalf of Cecil Rhodes. In 1891 a Free State expedition extracted a letter from Msiri agreeing to their agents coming to Katanga and later that year Leopold II sent the well-armed Stairs Expedition, led by the Canadian mercenary William Grant Stairs, to take possession of Katanga one way or another.

Msiri tried to play the Free State off against Rhodes and when negotiations bogged down, Stairs flew the Free State flag anyway and gave Msiri an ultimatum. Instead, Msiri decamped to another stockade. Stairs sent a force to capture him but Msiri stood his ground, whereupon Captain Omer Bodson shot Msiri dead and was fatally wounded in the resulting fight. The expedition cut off Msiri's head and put it on a pole, as he had often done to his enemies. This was to impress upon the locals that Msiri's rule had really ended, after which the successor chief recognized by Stairs signed the treaty.

=== War with Arab slavers ===
In the short term, the third problem, that of the African and Arab slavers like Zanzibari/Swahili strongman Tippu Tip (actually Ḥamad ibn Muḥammad ibn Jumʿah ibn Rajab ibn Muḥammad ibn Saʿīd al Murjabī, but mainly known by his nickname) was temporarily solved.

Initially the authority of the Congo Free State was relatively weak in the eastern regions of the Congo. In early 1887, Henry Morton Stanley had therefore proposed that Tippu Tip be made governor (wali) of the Stanley Falls District. Both Leopold II and Barghash bin Said of Zanzibar agreed and on 24 February 1887, Tippu Tip accepted.

In the longer term this alliance was indefensible at home and abroad. Leopold II was heavily criticized by the European public opinion for his dealings with Tippu Tip. In Belgium, the Belgian Anti-Slavery Society was founded in 1888, mainly by Catholic intellectuals led by Count Hippolyte d'Ursel, aimed at abolishing the Arab slave trade. Furthermore, Tippu Tip and Leopold were commercial rivals. Every person that Tippu Tip hunted down and put into chattel slavery and every pound of ivory he exported to Zanzibar was a loss to Leopold II. This, and Leopold's humanitarian pledges to the Berlin Conference to end slavery, meant war was inevitable.

Open warfare broke out in late November 1892. Both sides fought by proxy, arming and leading the populations of the upper Congo forests in conflict. By early 1894 the Zanzibari/Swahili slavers were defeated in the eastern Congo region and the Congo Arab war came to an end.

The Belgians freed thousands of men, women and children slaves from Swaihili Arab slave owners and slave traders in Eastern Congo in 1886–1892, enlisted them in the militia Force Publique or turned them over as prisoners to allied local chiefs, who in turn gave them as labourers for the Belgian conscript workers; when Belgian Congo was established, chattel slavery was legally abolished in 1910, but prisoners were nevertheless conscripted as force labourers for both public and private work projects.

=== The Lado Enclave ===
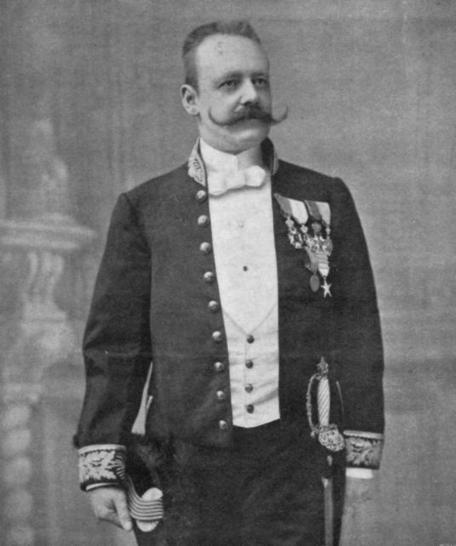
Francis Dhanis, ca. 1900

In 1894, King Leopold II signed a treaty with the United Kingdom which conceded a strip of land on the Free State's eastern border in exchange for the Lado Enclave, which provided access to the navigable Nile and extended the Free State's sphere of influence northward into Sudan. After rubber profits soared in 1895, Leopold ordered the organization of an expedition into the Lado Enclave, which had been overrun by Mahdist rebels since the outbreak of the Mahdist War in 1881.

The expedition had two columns: the first, under Belgian war hero Baron Dhanis, numbered around three-thousand, and was to strike north through the jungle and attack the rebels at their base at Rejaf. The second, a much smaller force of eight-hundred, was led by Louis-Napoléon Chaltin and took the main road towards Rejaf. Both expeditions set out in December 1896.

Although Leopold II had initially planned for the expedition to carry on much farther than the Lado Enclave, hoping indeed to take Fashoda and then Khartoum, Dhanis' column mutinied in February 1897, resulting in the death of several Belgian officers and the loss of his entire force. Nonetheless, Chaltin continued his advance, and on 17 February 1897, his outnumbered forces defeated the rebels in the Battle of Rejaf, securing the Lado Enclave as a Belgian territory until Leopold's death in 1909.

Leopold's conquest of the Lado Enclave met with approval from the British government, at least initially, which welcomed any aid in their ongoing war with Mahdist Sudan. But frequent raids outside of Lado territory by Belgian Congolese forces based in Rejaf caused alarm and suspicion among British and French officials wary of Leopold's imperial ambitions. In 1910, following the Belgian annexation of the Congo Free State as the Belgian Congo in 1908 and the death of the Belgian King in December 1909, British authorities reclaimed the Lado Enclave as per the Anglo-Congolese treaty signed in 1894, and added the territory to Anglo-Egyptian Sudan.

== Economy during Leopold's rule ==
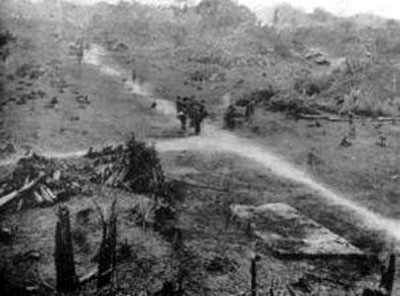
Clearing tropical forests ate away at profit margins. However, ample plots of cleared land were already available. Above, a Congolese farming village (Baringa, Equateur) is emptied and levelled to make way for a rubber plantation.

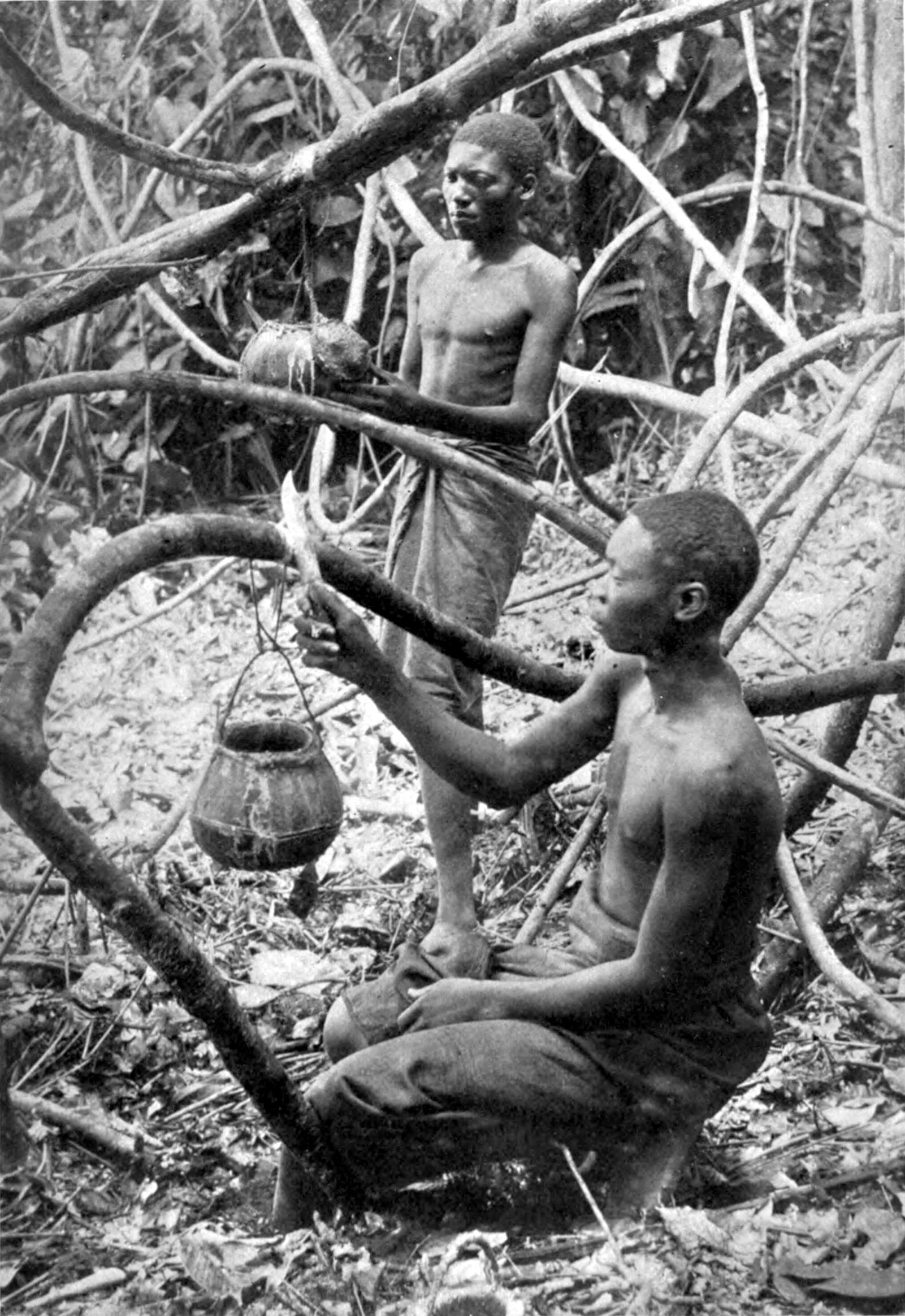
Congolese labourers tapping rubber near Lusambo in Kasai

While the war against African powers was ending, the quest for income was increasing, fuelled by the aire policy. By 1890, Leopold was facing considerable financial difficulty. District officials' salaries were reduced to a bare minimum, and made up with a commission payment based on the profit that their area returned to Leopold. After widespread criticism, this "primes system" was substituted for the allocation de retraite in which a large part of the payment was granted, at the end of the service, only to those territorial agents and magistrates whose conduct was judged "satisfactory" by their superiors. This meant in practice that nothing changed. Congolese communities in the Domaine Privé were not merely forbidden by law to sell items to anyone but the state; they were required to provide state officials with set quotas of rubber and ivory at a fixed, government-mandated price and to provide food to the local post.

In direct violation of his promises of free trade within the CFS under the terms of the Berlin Treaty, not only had the state become a commercial entity directly or indirectly trading within its dominion, but also, Leopold had been slowly monopolizing a considerable amount of the ivory and rubber trade by imposing export duties on the resources traded by other merchants within the CFS. In terms of infrastructure, Leopold's regime began construction of the railway that ran from the coast to the capital of Léopoldville (now Kinshasa). The railway, now known as the Matadi–Kinshasa Railway, was completed in 1898.

By the 1890s, John Boyd Dunlop's 1887 invention of inflatable, rubber bicycle tubes and the growing usage of the automobile dramatically increased global demand for rubber. To monopolize the resources of the entire Congo Free State, Leopold issued three decrees in 1891 and 1892 that reduced the Indigenous population to serfs. Collectively, these forced the locals to deliver all ivory and rubber, harvested or found, to state officers, nearly completing Leopold's monopoly of the ivory and rubber trade. The rubber came from wild vines in the jungle, unlike the rubber from Brazil (Hevea brasiliensis), which was tapped from trees. To extract the rubber, instead of tapping the vines, the Congolese workers would slash them and lather their bodies with the rubber latex. When the latex hardened, it would be scraped off the skin in a painful manner, as it took off the worker's hair with it.

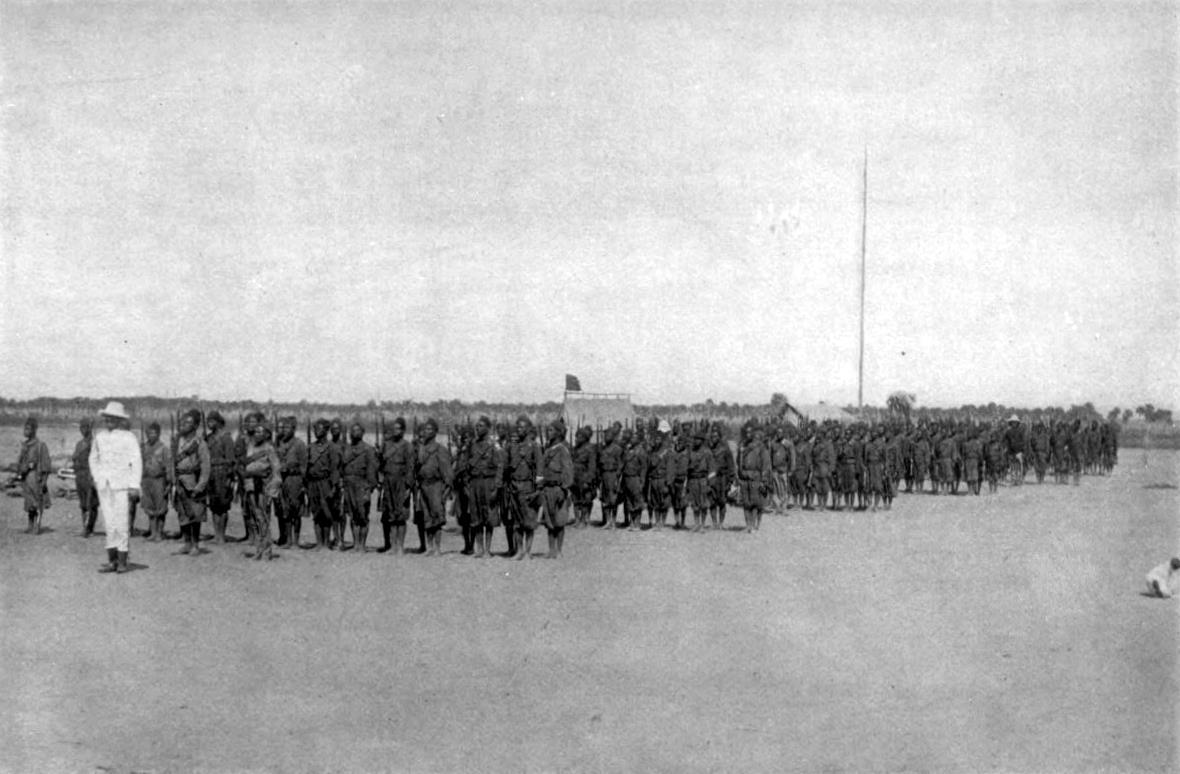
A typical Force Publique regiment, circa 1900

The Force Publique (FP), Leopold's private army, was used to enforce the rubber quotas. Early on, the FP was used primarily to campaign against the Arab slave trade in the Upper Congo, protect Leopold's economic interests, and suppress the frequent uprisings within the state. The FP's officer corps included only white Europeans (Belgian regular soldiers and mercenaries from other countries). On arriving in the Congo, the army included men from Zanzibar, West Africa, and eventually from the Congo itself. Leopold encouraged the slave trade among Arabs in the Upper Congo, in return for slaves to fill the ranks of the FP. In the 1890s, the FP's primary role was to exploit the natives as corvée labourers to promote the rubber trade.

Many of the black soldiers were from far-off peoples of the Upper Congo, while others had been kidnapped in raids on villages in their childhood and brought to Roman Catholic missions, where they received a military training in conditions close to slavery. Armed with modern weapons and the chicotte—a bull whip made of hippopotamus hide—the FP routinely took and tortured hostages, slaughtered families of rebels, and flogged and raped Congolese people with a reign of terror and abuse that cost millions of lives. One refugee from these horrors described the process:

We were always in the forest to find the rubber vines, to go without food, and our women had to give up cultivating the fields and gardens. Then we starved ... When we failed and our rubber was short, the soldiers came to our towns and killed us. Many were shot, some had their ears cut off; others were tied up with ropes round their necks and taken away.

They also burned recalcitrant villages, and above all, cut off the hands of Congolese locals, including children. The human hands were collected as trophies on the orders of their officers to show that bullets had not been wasted. Officers were concerned that their subordinates might waste their ammunition on hunting animals for sport, so they required soldiers to submit one hand for every bullet spent. These mutilations also served to further terrorize the Congolese into submission. This was all contrary to the promises of uplift made at the Berlin Conference which had recognized the Congo Free State.

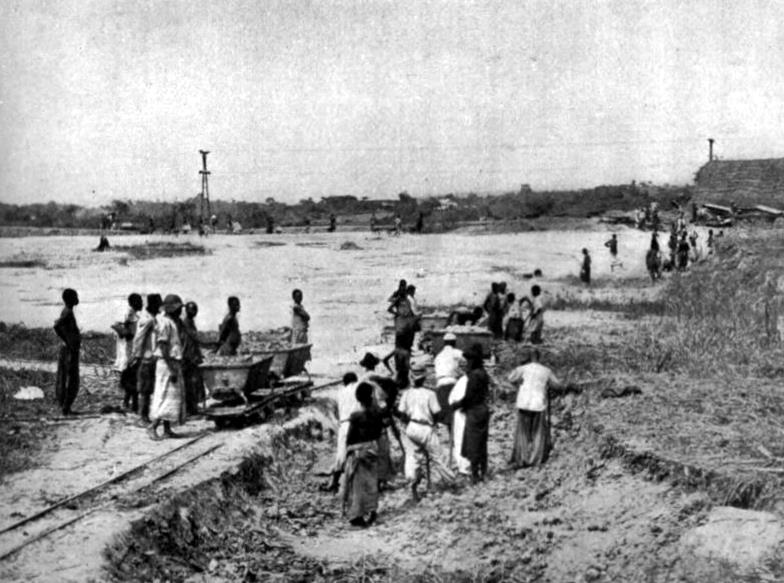
Congolese people working at the port of Léopoldville

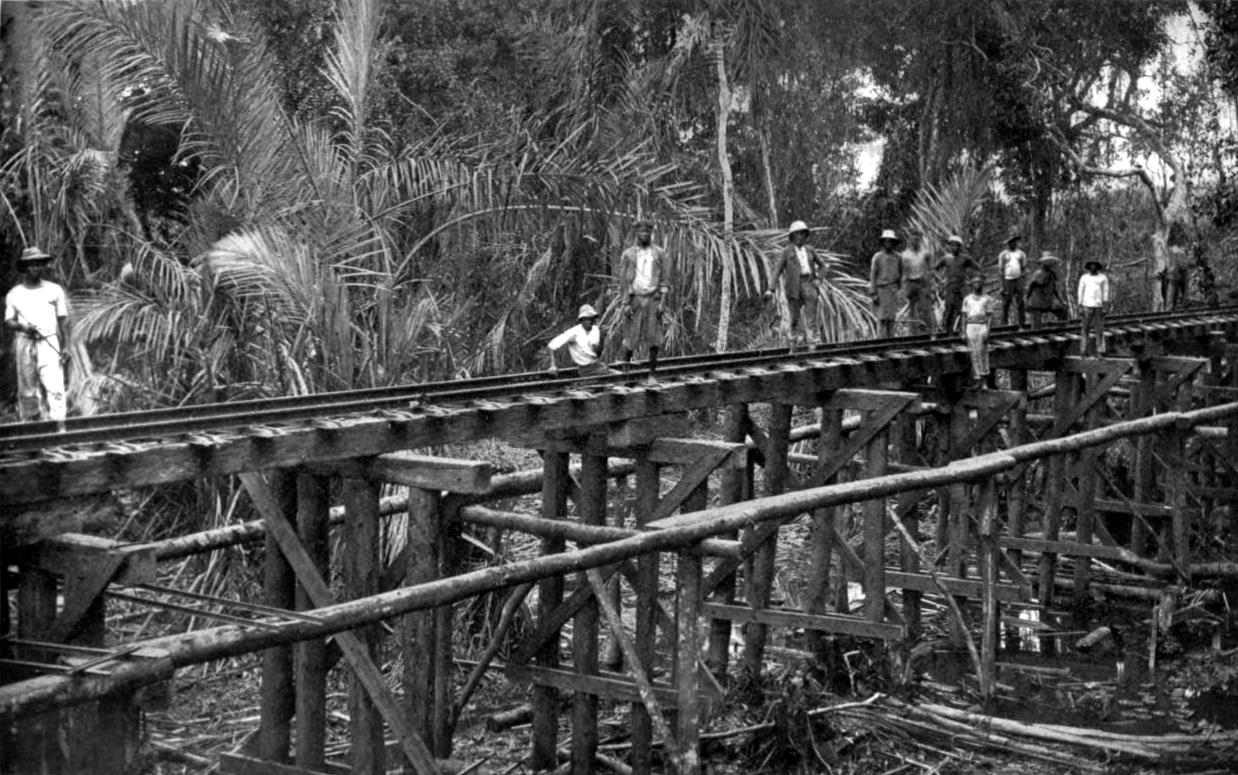
Construction of a railroad by Congolese workers

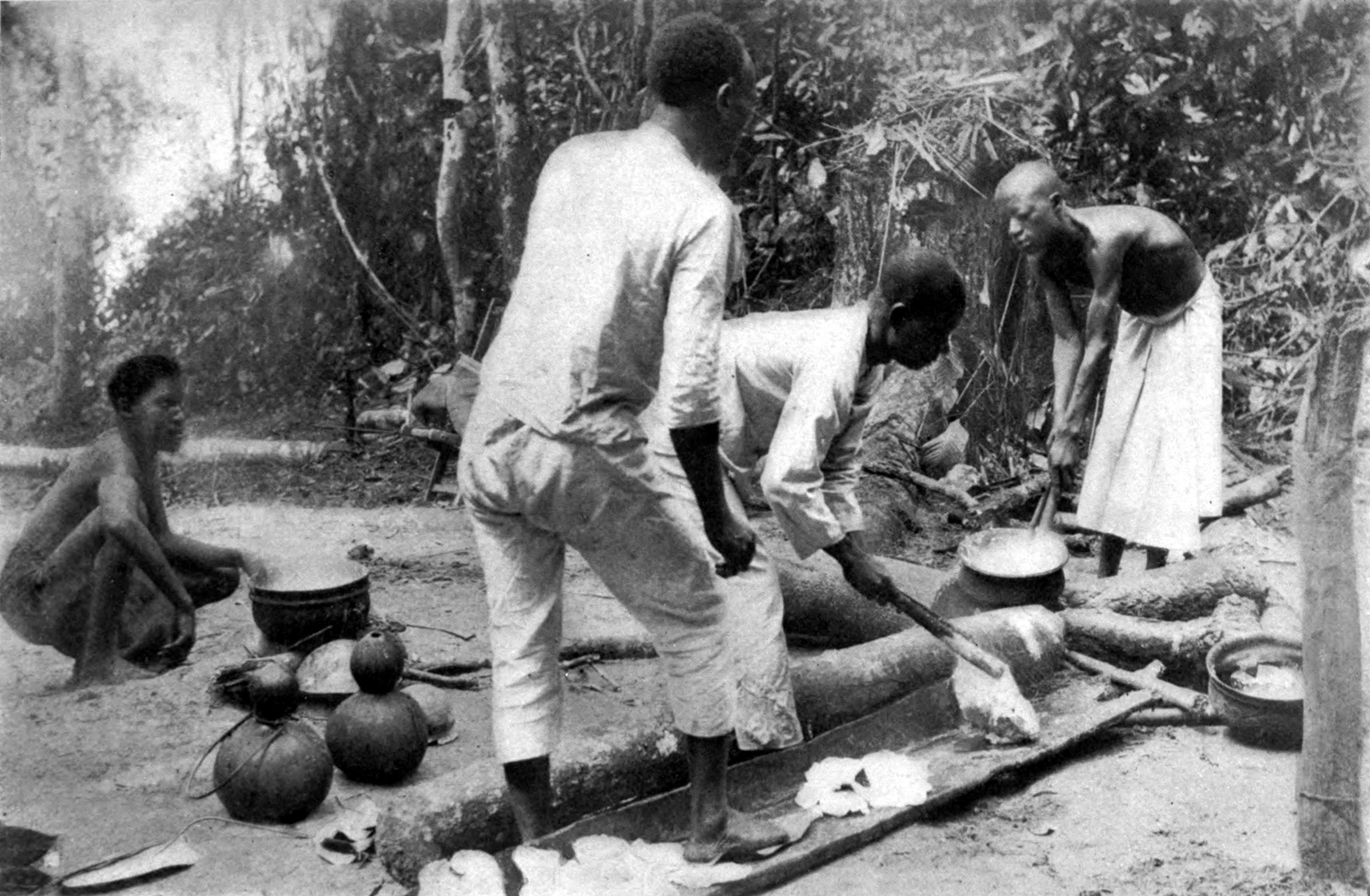
Melting latex of rubber in the forest of Lusambo

== Humanitarian disaster ==
=== Mutilation ===
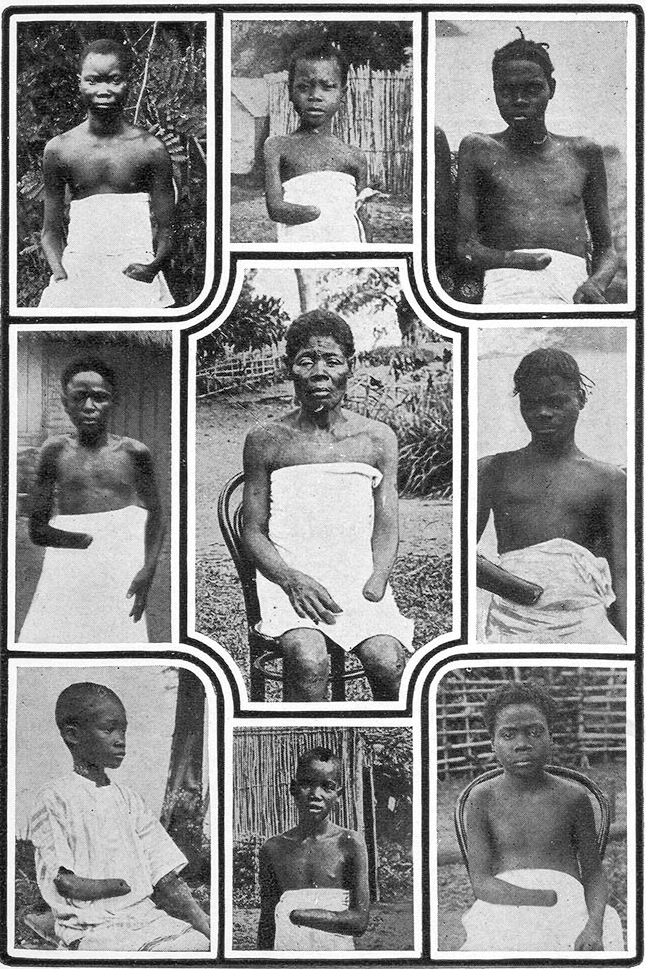
Mutilated Congolese children, image from King Leopold's Soliloquy, Mark Twain's political satire, where the ageing king complains that the incorruptible camera was the only witness he had encountered in his long experience that he could not bribe. The book was illustrated with photographs by John Hobbis Harris.

Failure to meet the rubber collection quotas was punishable by death. Meanwhile, the FP were required to provide the hand of their victims as proof when they had shot and killed someone, as it was believed that they would otherwise use the munitions (imported from Europe at considerable cost) for hunting. As a consequence, the rubber quotas were in part paid off in chopped-off hands. Sometimes the hands were collected by the soldiers of the FP, sometimes by the villages themselves. There were even small wars where villages attacked neighbouring villages to gather hands, since their rubber quotas were too unrealistic to fill. A Catholic priest quotes a man, Tswambe, speaking of the hated state official Léon Fiévez, who ran a district along the river 500 km (300 mi) north of Stanley Pool:

All blacks saw this man as the devil of the Equator ... From all the bodies killed in the field, you had to cut off the hands. He wanted to see the number of hands cut off by each soldier, who had to bring them in baskets ... A village which refused to provide rubber would be completely swept clean. As a young man, I saw [Fiévez's] soldier Molili, then guarding the village of Boyeka, take a net, put ten arrested natives in it, attach big stones to the net, and make it tumble into the river ... Rubber causes these torments; that's why we no longer want to hear its name spoken. Soldiers made young men kill or rape their own mothers and sisters.

One junior officer described a raid to punish a village that had protested. The officer in command "ordered us to cut off the heads of the men and hang them on the village palisades ... and to hang the women and the children on the palisade in the form of a cross". After seeing a Congolese person killed for the first time, a Danish missionary wrote: "The soldier said: 'Don't take this to heart so much. They kill us if we don't bring the rubber. The Commissioner has promised us if we have plenty of hands he will shorten our service.'" In Forbath's words:

The baskets of severed hands, set down at the feet of the European post commanders, became the symbol of the Congo Free State. ... The collection of hands became an end in itself. Force Publique soldiers brought them to the stations in place of rubber; they even went out to harvest them instead of rubber ... They became a sort of currency. They came to be used to make up for shortfalls in rubber quotas, to replace ... the people who were demanded for the forced labour gangs; and the Force Publique soldiers were paid their bonuses on the basis of how many hands they collected.

In theory, each right hand proved a killing. In practice, to save ammunition soldiers sometimes "cheated" by simply cutting off the hand and leaving the victim to live or die. More than a few survivors later said that they had lived through a massacre by acting dead, not moving even when their hands were severed, and waiting till the soldiers left before seeking help. In some instances a soldier could shorten his service term by bringing more hands than the other soldiers, which led to widespread mutilations and dismemberment according to some historians.

=== Cannibalism ===
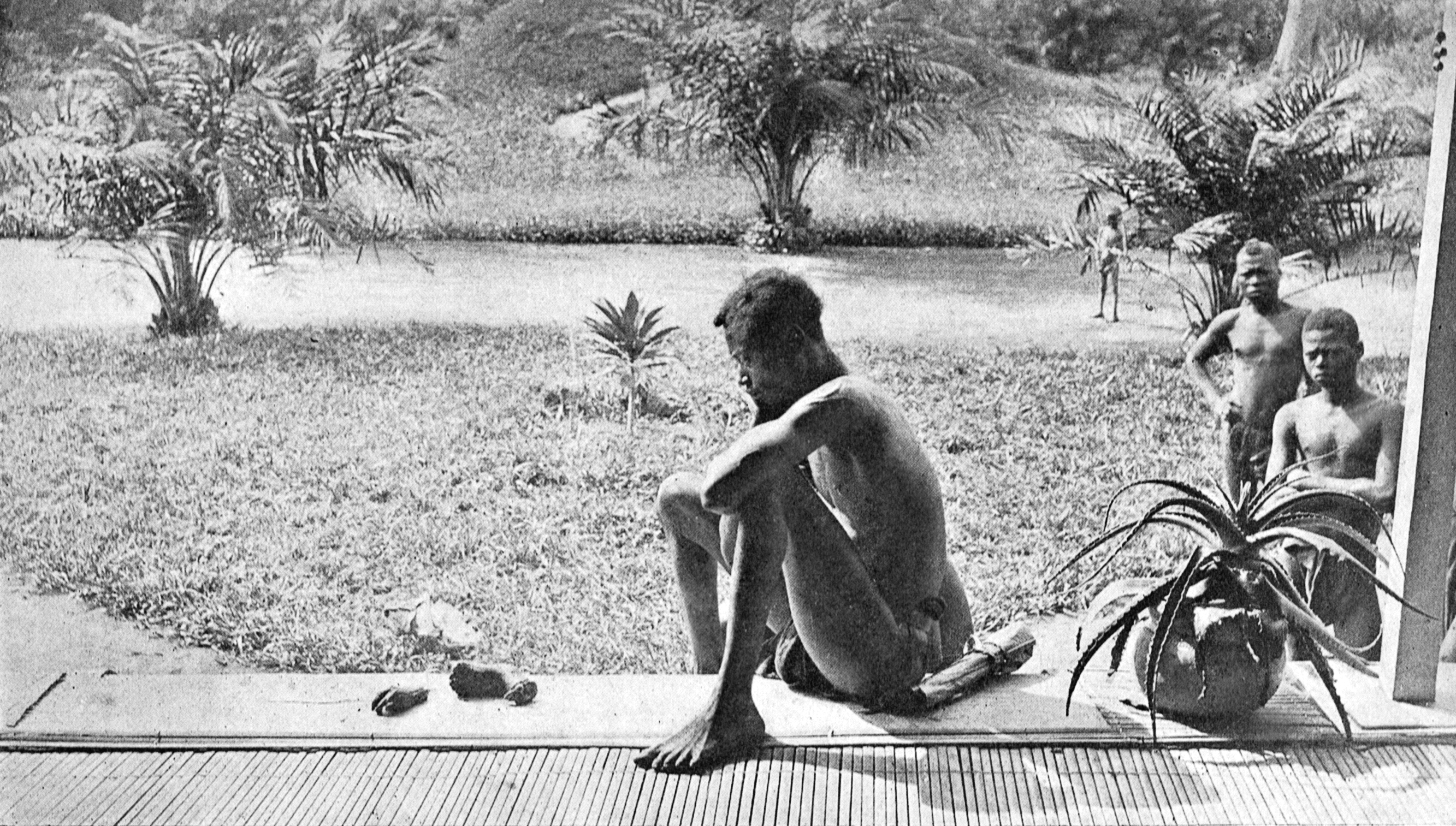
A Congolese man, Nsala, looking at the severed hand and foot of his five-year-old daughter who in 1904 was killed, cooked, and cannibalized by armed guards of a company holding a concession for rubber collection

Cannibalism was widespread in parts of the Free State area when the state was established, and the colonial administration seems to have done little to suppress it, sometimes rather tolerating it among its own auxiliary African troops and allies. During the Congo–Arab war, there were reports of widespread cannibalization of the bodies of defeated combatants by the Batetela allies of the Belgian commander Francis Dhanis. According to Dhanis's medical officer, Captain Sidney Langford Hinde, the conquest of Nyangwe was followed by "days of cannibal feasting" during which hundreds were eaten, with only their heads being kept as mementos.

Soon after, Nyangwe's surviving population rose in a rebellion, during whose brutal suppression a thousand rioters were killed by the new government. One young Belgian officer wrote home: "Happily Gongo's men ... ate them up [in a few hours]. It's horrible but exceedingly useful and hygienic.... I should have been horrified at the idea in Europe! but it seems quite natural to me here. Don't show this letter to anyone indiscreet".

When sending out "punitive expeditions" against villages unwilling or unable to fulfil the government's exorbitant rubber quota, Free State officials repeatedly turned a blind eye both to arbitrary killings of those considered guilty as well as to the "cannibal feast[s]" celebrated by local soldiers that sometimes followed. In various cases they even handed captives, including infants and old women, over to their soldiers or local allies, implicitly or even explicitly allowing them to kill and eat them.

Particularly infamous were groups of Songye fighters "known as Zappo Zaps after the sound of their rifles" and employed by the Free State to enforce its tax policies: "Whenever a village failed to produce enough rubber, these men would attack, raping and eating their victims before cutting off their hands" (to prove the success of their operations).

Repeated reports of "feasts of human flesh" held by Force Publique soldiers reached and shocked even the European public. Free State officials largely denied knowledge of such practices and promised severe punishments for any that were discovered, but actually took little action.

=== Death toll ===
A reduction of the population of the Congo is noted by all who have compared the country at the beginning of Leopold's control with the beginning of Belgian state rule in 1908, but estimates of the death toll vary considerably. Estimates of some contemporary observers suggest that the population decreased by half during this period. According to Morel, the Congo Free State counted "20 million souls". Hence, Mark Twain mentioned the number of ten million deaths. According to Irish diplomat Roger Casement, this depopulation had four main causes: "indiscriminate war", starvation, reduction of births, and disease. Sleeping sickness was also a major cause of fatality at the time. Opponents of Leopold's rule stated, however, that the administration itself was to be considered responsible for the spreading of the epidemic.

In the absence of a census providing even an initial idea of the size of population of the region at the inception of the Congo Free State (the first was taken in 1924), it is impossible to quantify population changes in the period. Despite this, Forbath in 1977 claimed the loss was at least five million. Adam Hochschild and Jan Vansina note 10 million. Hochschild cites several recent independent lines of investigation, by anthropologist Jan Vansina and others, that examine local sources (police records, religious records, oral traditions, genealogies, personal diaries), which generally agree with the assessment of the 1919 Belgian government commission: roughly half the population perished during the Free State period. Since the first official census by the Belgian authorities in 1924 put the population at about 10 million, these various approaches suggest a rough estimate of a total of 10 million dead.

Jan Vansina returned to the issue of quantifying the total population decline, and revised his earlier position, criticizing Hochschild for extrapolating the 50% death toll from the rubber provinces to the entirety of the Congo. He concluded that the Kuba population (one of the Congolese populations) was rising during the first two decades of Leopold II's rule, and declined by 25 per cent from 1900 to 1919, mainly due to sickness. Others argued a decrease of 20 per cent over the first forty years of colonial rule (up to the census of 1924). According to the Congolese historian Isidore Ndaywel è Nziem 13 million died, although he later reduced it to 10 million. To put these population changes in context, sourced references state that in 1900 Africa as a whole had between 90 million and 133 million people.

More recent extensive demographic research agrees with Vansina in his criticism of Hochschild's 10 million claim. The current estimate for the population in 1885 is stated at around most likely 11.5 million. The first head count of the population after Leopolds reign put the population at 10 or 10.3 million, which is a population decrease of around 1.2 or 1.5 million people. The causes of the decline were multifactorial and included lower fertility, disease, famine, armed violence and mass emigration. However, no verifiable complete records exist. Louis and Stengers state that population figures at the start of Leopold's control are only "wild guesses", while calling Morel's attempt and others at coming to a figure for population losses "but figments of the imagination". However, authors that point out the lack of reliable demographic data are questioned by others calling the former minimalists and agnosticists, proving that these questions remain the object of heated debate.

== International criticism ==
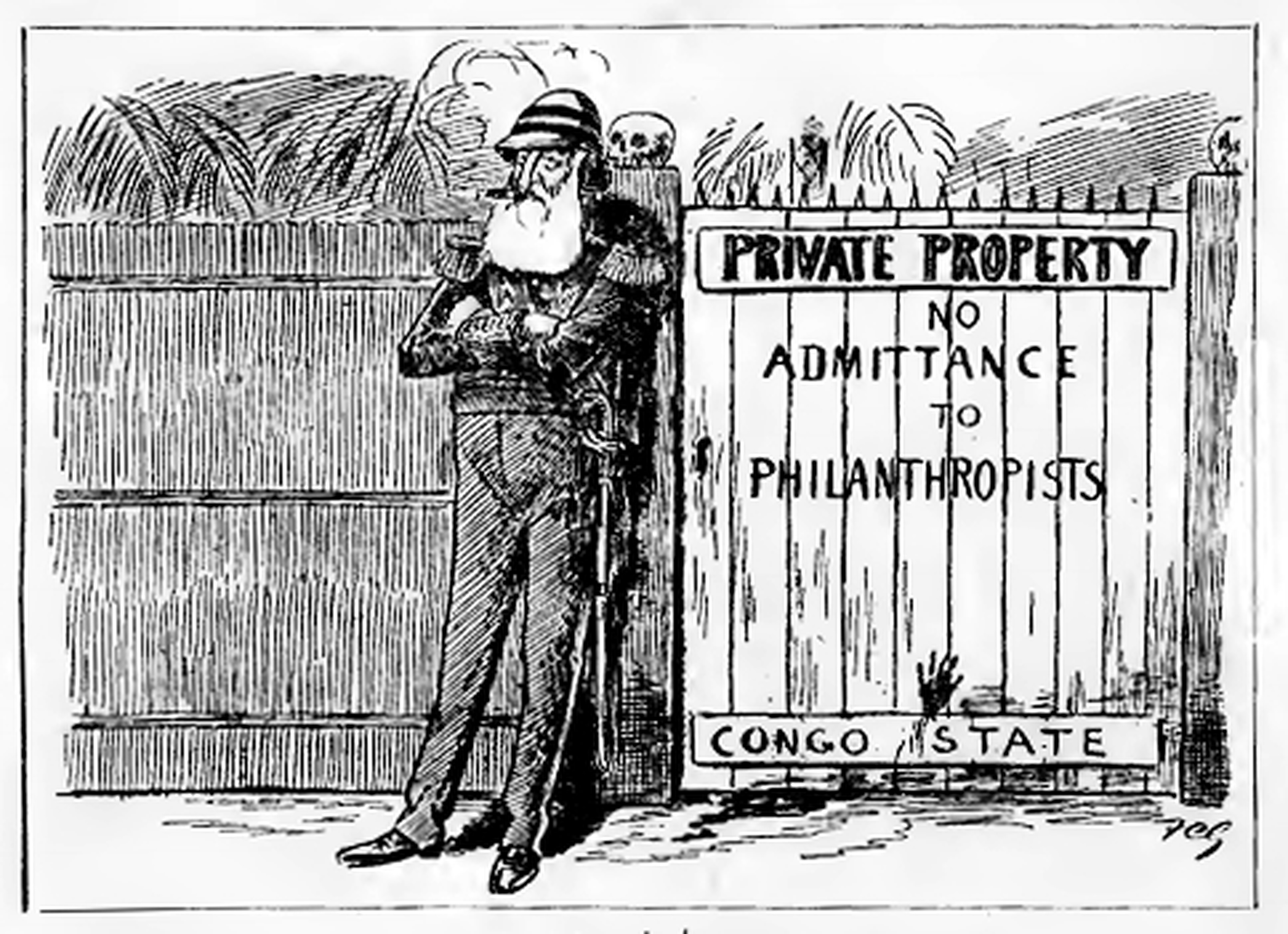
A cartoon by British caricaturist Francis Carruthers Gould depicting King Leopold II, and the Congo Free State

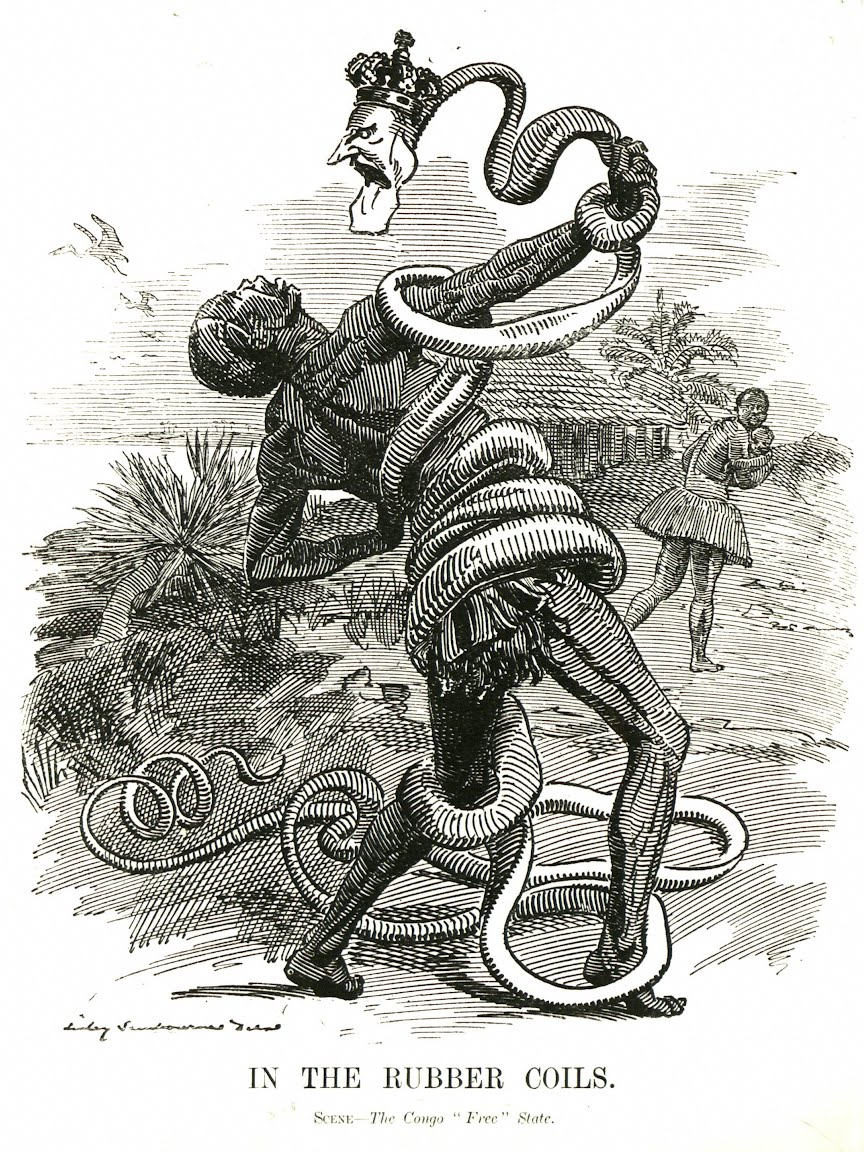
A 1906 Punch cartoon by Edward Linley Sambourne depicting Leopold II as a rubber snake entangling a Congolese rubber collector

Leopold ran up high debts with his Congo investments before the beginning of the worldwide rubber boom in the 1890s. Prices increased throughout the decade as industries discovered new uses for rubber in tires, hoses, tubing, insulation for telegraph and telephone cables and wiring. By the late-1890s, wild rubber had far surpassed ivory as the main source of revenue from the Congo Free State. The peak year was 1903, with rubber fetching the highest price and concessionary companies raking in the highest profits.

However, the boom sparked efforts to find lower-cost producers. Congolese concessionary companies started facing competition from rubber cultivation in Southeast Asia and Latin America. As plantations were begun in other tropical regions around the world, the global price of rubber started to dip. Competition heightened the drive to exploit forced labour in the Congo in order to lower production costs. Meanwhile, the cost of enforcement was eating away at profit margins, along with the toll taken by the increasingly unsustainable harvesting methods. As competition from other areas of rubber cultivation mounted, Leopold's private rule was left increasingly vulnerable to international scrutiny.

Missionaries carefully documented and exposed atrocities committed. Eye-witness reports from missionaries portrayed actions by the state that broke laws set by the European nations. As rumours circulated Leopold attempted to discredit them, even creating a Commission for the Protection of the Natives. In January 1908, William Henry Sheppard published a report on colonial abuses in the American Presbyterian Congo Mission (APCM) newsletter, and both he and William Morrison were sued for libel against the Kasai Rubber Company (Compagnie de Kasai), a prominent Belgian rubber contractor in the area. When the case went to court in September 1909, the two missionaries had support from the CRA, US Progressives, and their lawyer Emile Vandervelde. The judge acquitted Sheppard (Morrison had been acquitted earlier on a technicality) on the premise that his editorial had not named the major company, but smaller charter companies instead. However, it is likely that the case was decided in favour of Sheppard as a result of international politics; the US, socially in support of the missionaries, had questioned the validity of King Leopold II's rule over the Congo.

Sheppard's documented cases of cruelty or violence were in direct violation of the Berlin Act of 1885, which gave Leopold II control over the Congo as long as he "care[d] for the improvements of their conditions of their moral and material well-being" and "help[ed] in suppressing slavery." However, historians have noted that he and other missionaries have traditionally received little recognition for their contributions and reports.

=== Congo Reform Association ===
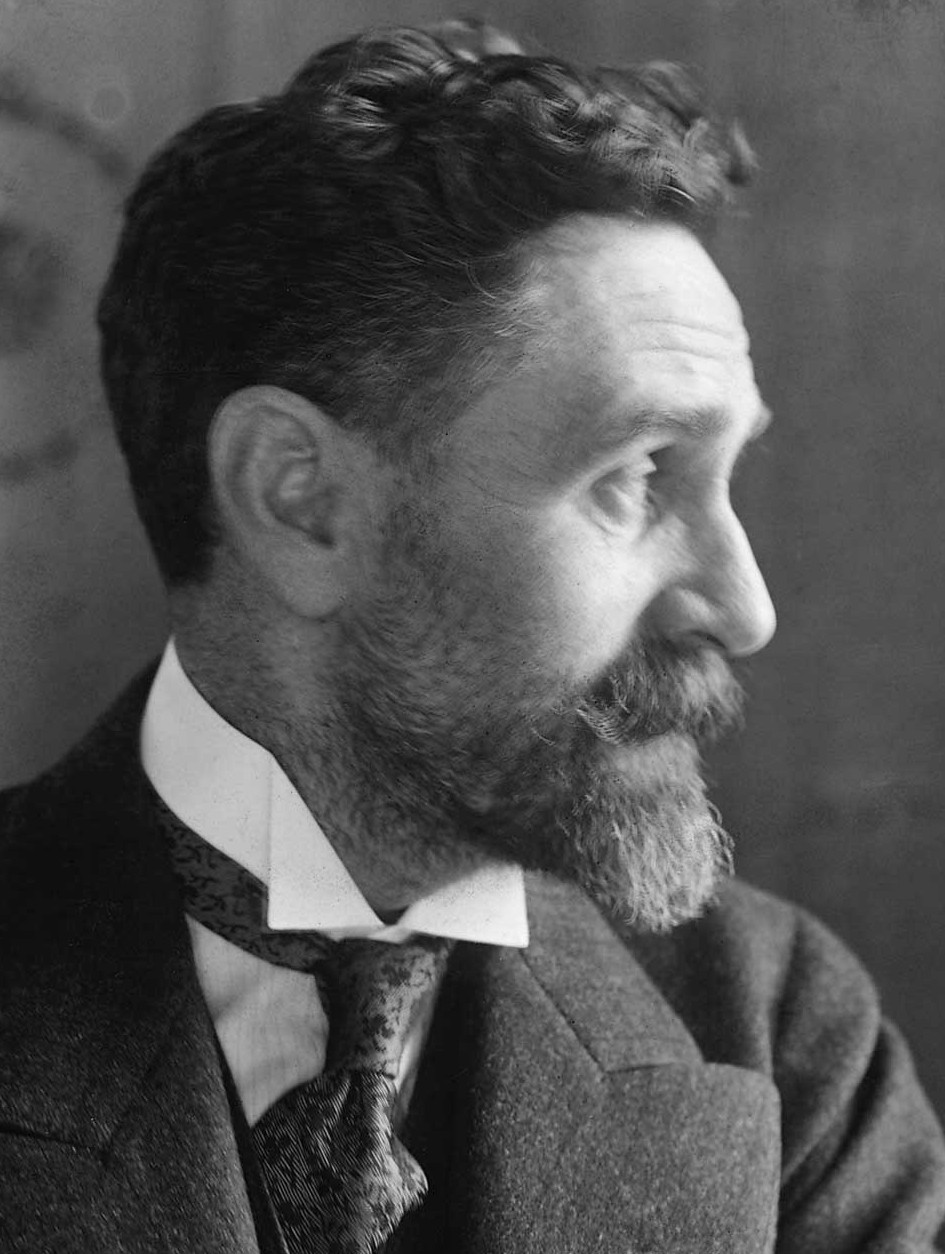
Roger Casement

E.D. Morel

Joseph Conrad's novel Heart of Darkness, originally published in 1899 as a three-part series in Blackwood's Magazine, inspired by his service as a captain on a steamer on the Congo 12 years before, sparked an organized international opposition to Leopold's exploitational activities. In 1900, E. D. Morel, a part-time journalist and head of trade with Congo for the Liverpool shipping firm Elder Dempster, noticed that ships that brought vast loads of rubber from the Congo only ever returned there loaded with guns and ammunition for the Force Publique.

Morel became a journalist and then a publisher, attempting to discredit Leopold's regime. In 1902, Morel retired from his position at Elder Dempster to focus on campaigning. He founded his own magazine, The West African Mail, and conducted speaking tours in Britain. His writing included condemnations of his former employer Sir Alfred Lewis Jones, who was engaged in consular duties representing Leopold and the Congo Free State. Jones had initially offered the paper his financial backing, apparently in a final attempt to moderate Morel's criticism of the company, but soon discontinued his support.

Increasing public outcry over the atrocities in the CFS moved the British government to launch an official investigation. In 1903, Morel and those who agreed with him in the House of Commons succeeded in passing a resolution calling on the British government to conduct an inquiry into alleged violations of the Berlin Agreement. Roger Casement, then the British Consul at Boma (at the mouth of the Congo River), was sent to the Congo Free State to investigate. Reporting back to the Foreign Office in 1900, Casement wrote:

The root of the evil lies in the fact that the government of the Congo is above all a commercial trust, that everything else is orientated towards commercial gain ...

Morel was introduced to Roger Casement by their mutual friend Herbert Ward just before the publication of Casement's 1904 detailed eyewitness report—known as the Casement Report—in 1904 and realized that he had found the ally he had sought. Casement convinced Morel to establish an organization for dealing specifically with the Congo question, the Congo Reform Association (CRA). With Casement's and Dr. Guinness's assistance, he set up and ran the CRA, which worked to end Leopold's control of the Congo Free State. Branches of the association were established as far away as the United States. The Congo Reform movement's members included Sir Arthur Conan Doyle, Mark Twain, Joseph Conrad, Booker T. Washington, and Bertrand Russell.

The mass deaths in the Congo Free State became a cause célèbre in the last years of the 19th century. The Congo reform movement led a vigorous international movement against the maltreatment of the Congolese population. The British Parliament demanded a meeting of the 14 signatory powers to review the 1885 Berlin Agreement. The Belgian Parliament, pushed by Emile Vandervelde and other critics of the king's Congolese policy, forced Leopold to set up an independent commission of inquiry, and despite the king's efforts, in 1905 it confirmed Casement's report.

One of the main ways Britain was involved in ending Leopold's rule in the Congo, was by making Belgium, as a whole, more aware of the brutality present in the Congo. Morel was one of the key British activists for a Congo free from Belgian rule. Once the US became aware of the occurrences in the Congo, Morel began the CRA. One of the methods Morel used to make the world more aware of the atrocities in the Congo during Leopold's rule was through the press. Articles were published in both magazines and newspapers in order to make the people of these powerful countries, such as the US and Great Britain, more aware of what truly was being done in this part of Africa. With this newfound unwanted publicity, the Belgian government was pressured in assuming control of the Congo from Leopold.

Individuals such as George Washington Williams also had a significant impact on the Congo Free State propaganda war. In his famous letter, "An Open Letter to His Serene Majesty Léopold II, King of the Belgians and Sovereign of the Independent State of Congo", sent on 18 July 1890, Williams described in great detail the crimes committed against the residents of the Congo and their overall mistreatment. This letter was a key factor in the propaganda struggle over conditions in the Congo.

== Belgian annexation of the Congo Free State as the Belgian Congo ==
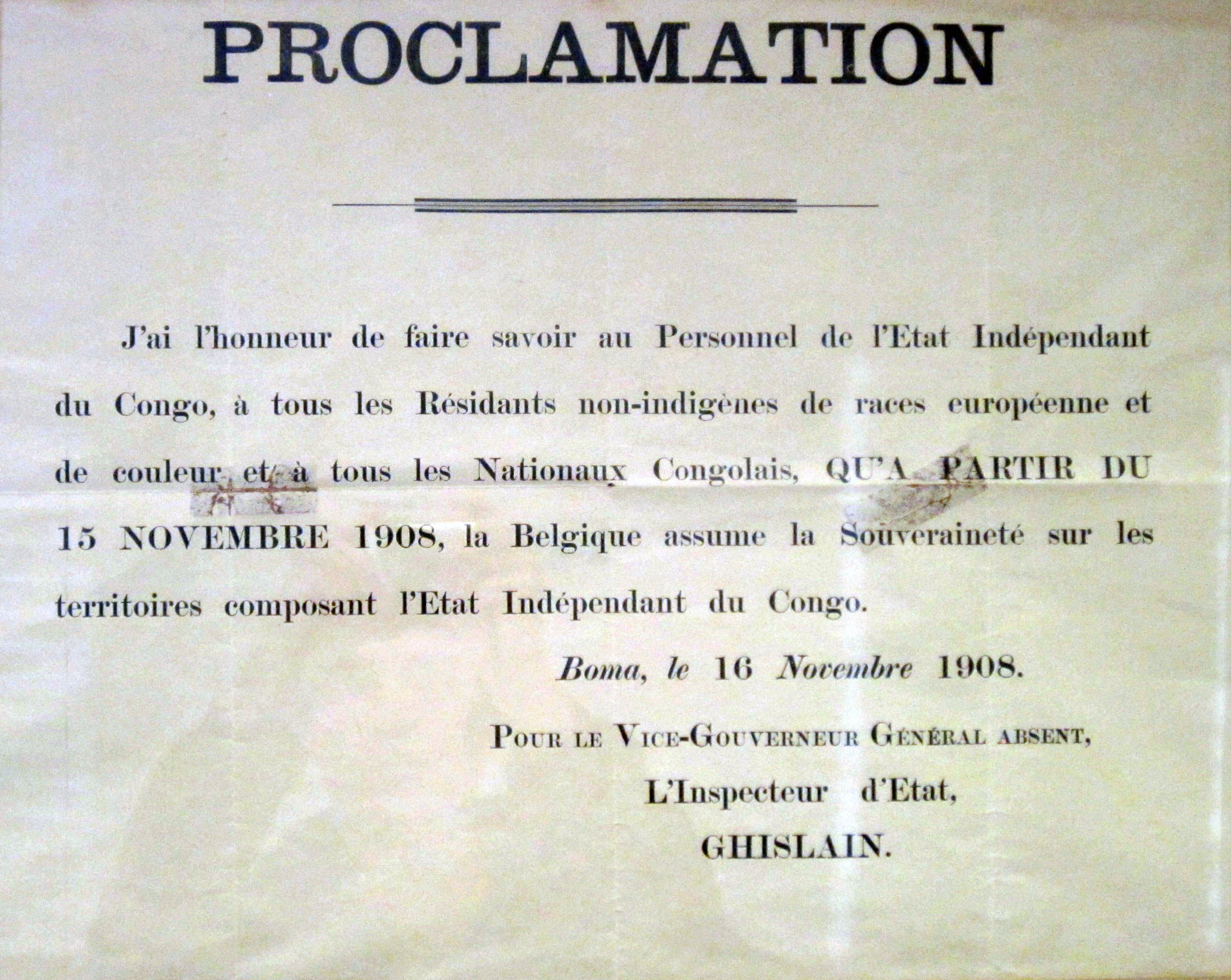
A proclamation from Inspector-general Ghislain to the population of the Congo, announcing the annexation of the territory by Belgium in 1908

Leopold II offered to reform his Congo Free State regime, but international opinion supported an end to the king's rule, though no nation was initially willing to accept the responsibility of ruling the colony. Belgium was the obvious European candidate to annex the Congo Free State. For two years, it debated the question and held new elections on the issue.

Yielding to international pressure, the parliament of Belgium annexed the Congo Free State and took over its administration on 15 November 1908, as the colony of the Belgian Congo. The governance of the Belgian Congo was outlined in the 1908 Colonial Charter. Despite being effectively removed from power, the international scrutiny was no major loss to Leopold II—who died in Brussels on 17 December 1909—or to the concessionary companies in the Congo. By then, Southeast Asia and Latin America had become lower-cost producers of rubber.

Along with the effects of resource depletion in the Congo, international commodity prices had fallen to a level that rendered Congolese extraction unprofitable. Just prior to releasing sovereignty over the CFS, Leopold had all evidence of his activities in the CFS destroyed, including the archives of the departments of finance and of the interior. Leopold II lost the absolute power he had had there, but the population now had a Belgian colonial regime, which had become heavily paternalistic, with church, state, and private companies all instructed to oversee the welfare of the inhabitants.

== Legacy ==
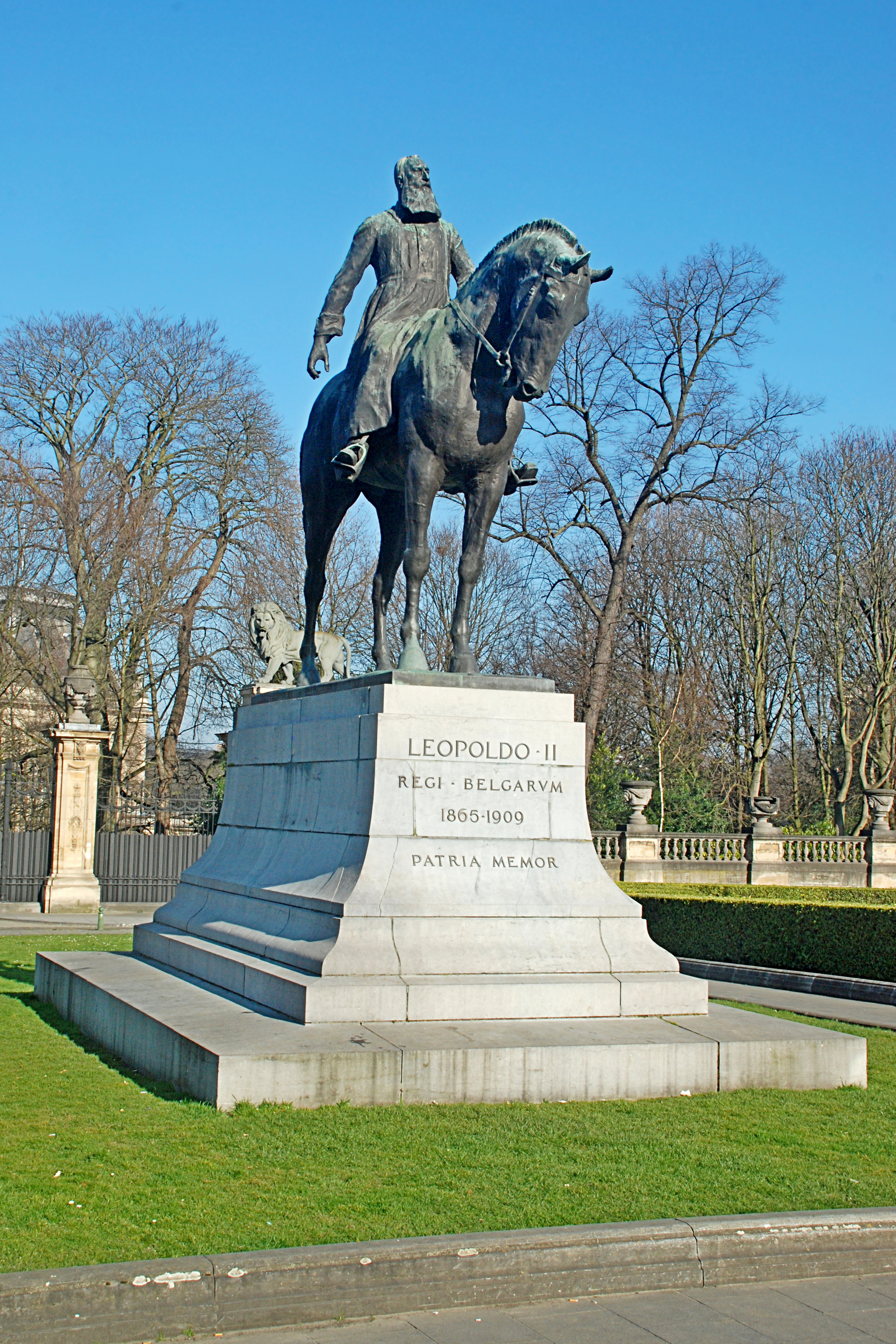
Equestrian Statue of Leopold II, Place du Trône/Troonplein, Brussels

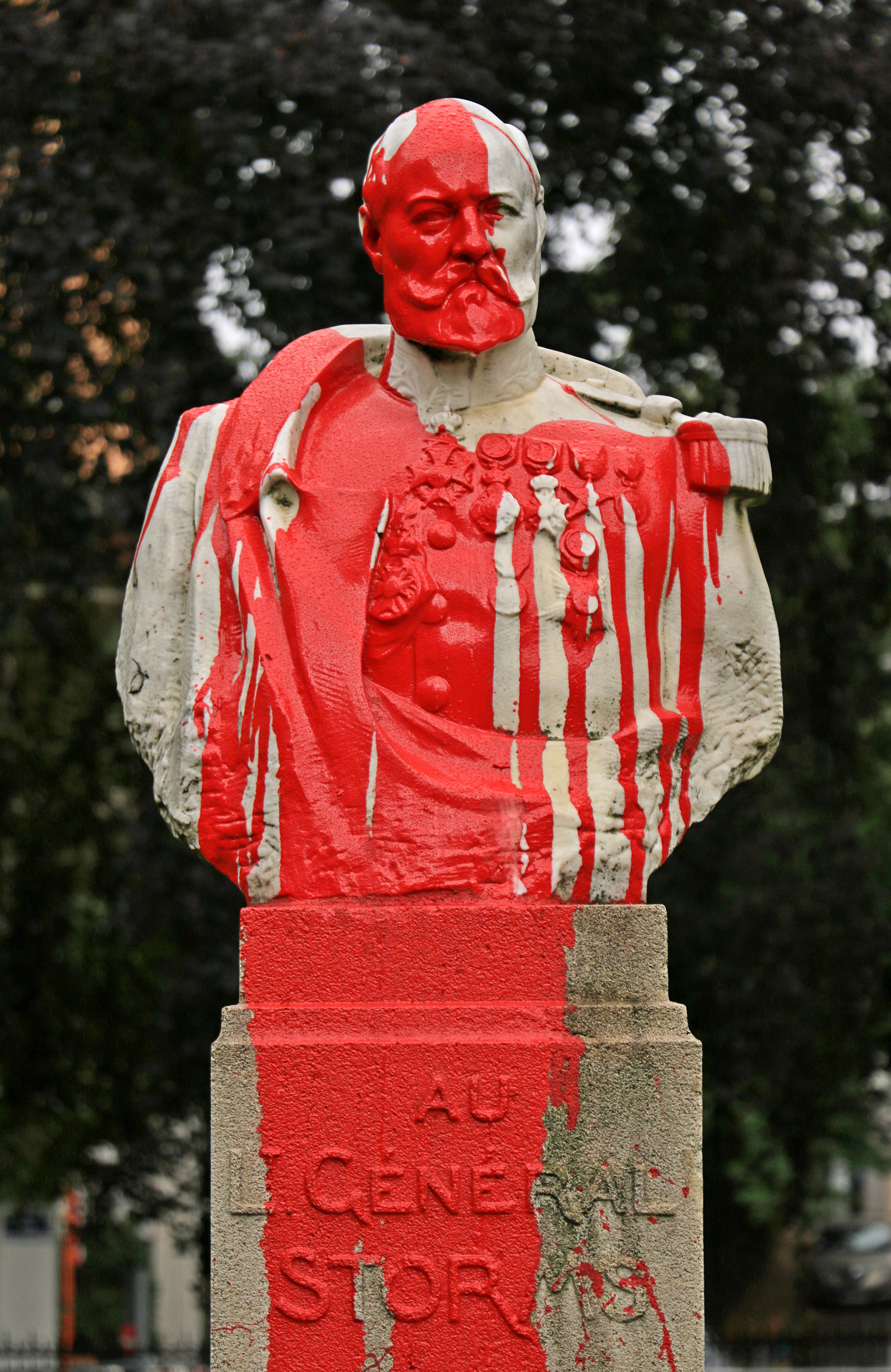
The Monument to General Storms in Brussels daubed in red paint, symbol of the blood of the Congolese people

The Order of the Crown, originally created in 1897, rewarded heroic deeds and service achieved while serving in the Congo Free State. The Order was made a decoration of the Belgian state with the abolition of the Congo Free State in 1908 and is still awarded today.

Between 1886 and 1908 the Free State issued a number of postage stamps. These typically showed scenes of wildlife, landscapes, and natives.

Coins were minted from 1887 to 1908, using the Belgian standard. They ranged from a copper 1 Centime through a silver 5 Francs. The lower values showed a star on the obverse and were holed, the higher ones had a bust of Leopold II.

=== Genocide question ===
In the aftermath of the 1998 publication of King Leopold's Ghost by Adam Hochschild, where he had written "the killing in the Congo was of genocidal proportions", but "it was not strictly speaking a genocide", The Guardian reported that the Royal Museum for Central Africa in Brussels would finance an investigation into some of the claims made by Hochschild. An investigatory panel announced in 2002, likely to be headed by Professor Jean-Luc Vellut, was scheduled to report its findings in 2004. Robert G. Weisbord stated in the 2003 Journal of Genocide Research that attempting to eliminate a portion of the population is enough to qualify as genocide under the UN convention. In the case of the Congo Free State, the unbearable conditions would qualify as a genocide.

In the aftermath of the report, an exhibition was held at the Royal Museum for Central Africa entitled The Memory of Congo. Critics, including Hochschild, claimed that there were "distortions and evasions" in the exhibition and stated: "The exhibit deals with this question in a wall panel misleadingly headed 'Genocide in the Congo?' This is a red herring, for no reputable historian of the Congo has made charges of genocide; a forced labor system, although it may be equally deadly, is different."

An early day motion presented to the British Parliament in 2006 described "the tragedy of King Leopold's regime" as genocide and called for an apology from the Belgian government. It received the signature of 48 members of parliament.

== See also ==
- List of colonial governors of the Congo Free State and Belgian Congo
- Districts of the Congo Free State
- King Leopold's Ghost
- King Leopold's Soliloquy
- The Crime of the Congo
- Heart of Darkness
- Lado Enclave
- Anglo-Belgian India Rubber Company
- Brussels Anti-Slavery Conference 1889–90
- Brussels Conference Act of 1890
- Royal Museum for Central Africa
- Swedish soldiers in the Congo Free State
