= Colonial Charter on the Belgian annexation of the Congo Free State =

1908 annexation of the Congo Free State by Belgium

The Colonial Charter on the Belgian annexation of the Congo Free State (French: Charte coloniale de 1908) was approved by the Belgian Parliament on 18 October 1908. On 15 November 1908, Belgium assumed sovereignty over the territories comprising the Congo Free State, reorganizing it as the Belgian Congo.

== Prelude ==
Colonial rule in the Congo began in the late 19th century. King Leopold II of Belgium attempted to persuade the government to support colonial expansion around the then-largely uncharted Congo Basin. The Belgian government's ambivalence resulted in Leopold's creating a colony on his own account. With support from a number of Western countries at the Berlin Conference, Leopold achieved international recognition for a personal colony, the Congo Free State, in 1885. By the turn of the century, however, the atrocities committed by Free State officials and international mercenaries against indigenous Congolese and a ruthless system of economic exploitation led to intense diplomatic pressure on Belgium to take official control of the country, which it did by ratifying the Colonial Charter on the Belgian annexation of the Congo Free State, thus creating the Belgian Congo in 1908.

== First draft ==
At the beginning of the 20th century, the Belgian press and the public opinion were becoming increasingly wary of the policies of Leopold's African state. Parliamentarians protested against the inhumane practices in the Congo Free State and Congo became a divisive issue in Belgian domestic politics. The Belgian government urged the ageing and stubborn king to agree to the transfer of the Congo Free State to Belgium. The Belgian parliament started on an initial legislation for the future Belgian colony, a long and difficult process. A first draft of the Colonial Charter had already been written in 1901, but with an overtone of royal absolutism, the initial draft included provisions for Leopold II to hold on to a private Crown Domain. His goal was to exclude vast regions of the Congo from the government's control, in order to maintain his personal fortune. Only by the end of 1906 King Leopold II accepted the annexation, after foreign powers (including the British Empire and the United States) threatened to organize an international convention on the Congo.

== Ratification ==
By 1906 this first draft had become unacceptable and the Belgian parliament established a special commission responsible for preparing a new bill concerning the governance of the Belgian Congo. This commission eventually excluded all the provisions relating to royal domination. At the time of the vote in 1908, there was deep political division on the annexation of the Congo Free State. Political rallies and the dispersion of pamphlets favouring or opposing the annexation increased. A majority of the socialists and the radicals firmly opposed this annexation and reaped electoral benefits from their anti-colonialist campaign. However, some socialists believed that the country should annex the Congo and play a humanitarian role with regard to the Congolese population. Eventually, two Catholic MPs and half of the Liberal MPs joined the socialists in rejecting the Colonial Charter (forty-eight votes against) and nearly all the Catholics and the other half of the Liberal MPs approved the charter (ninety votes for and seven abstentions). Thus, on 15 November 1908 the Belgian Congo became a colony of the Belgian Kingdom.

== Law index ==
the law consists of six chapters and 38 articles.

Laws over the Belgian Congolese government
Chapter	Titles	Number of articles
Chapter I	The legal situation of the Belgian Congo	1
Chapter II	The rights of Belgians, foreigners, and natives	5
Chapter III	The exercising of powers	16
Chapter IV	The minister of the colonies and the colonial council	4
Chapter V	External relations	2
Chapter VI	General provisions	9
Note	Transition provision	1

The Charter was modified and completed with the laws of 30 March ; 6 March ; 9 December 1912 ; the decree of 14 novembre 1916; laws of 10 August 1912, 12 August 1923 ; 15 April ; 3 August 1924 ; 26 November 1926 ; 18 May 1929 ; 22 July 1931 ; 27 June 1935 ; the decree of 19 May 1942 ; the law of 13 June 1951 and the law of 11 July 1951.
