= Harriet Brown (disambiguation) =

Harriet Brown is an American writer, magazine editor, and professor.

Harriet Brown may also refer to:

- Harriet A. Brown (1847–c. 1930), American inventor
- Harriet Connor Brown (1872–1962), American women's rights activist and author
- Harriet Elizabeth Brown (1907–2009), American educator

== See also ==
- Harriet Miller-Brown (born 1991), New Zealand retired alpine ski racer
