= Black Horror on the Rhine =

Racial panic in interwar Germany

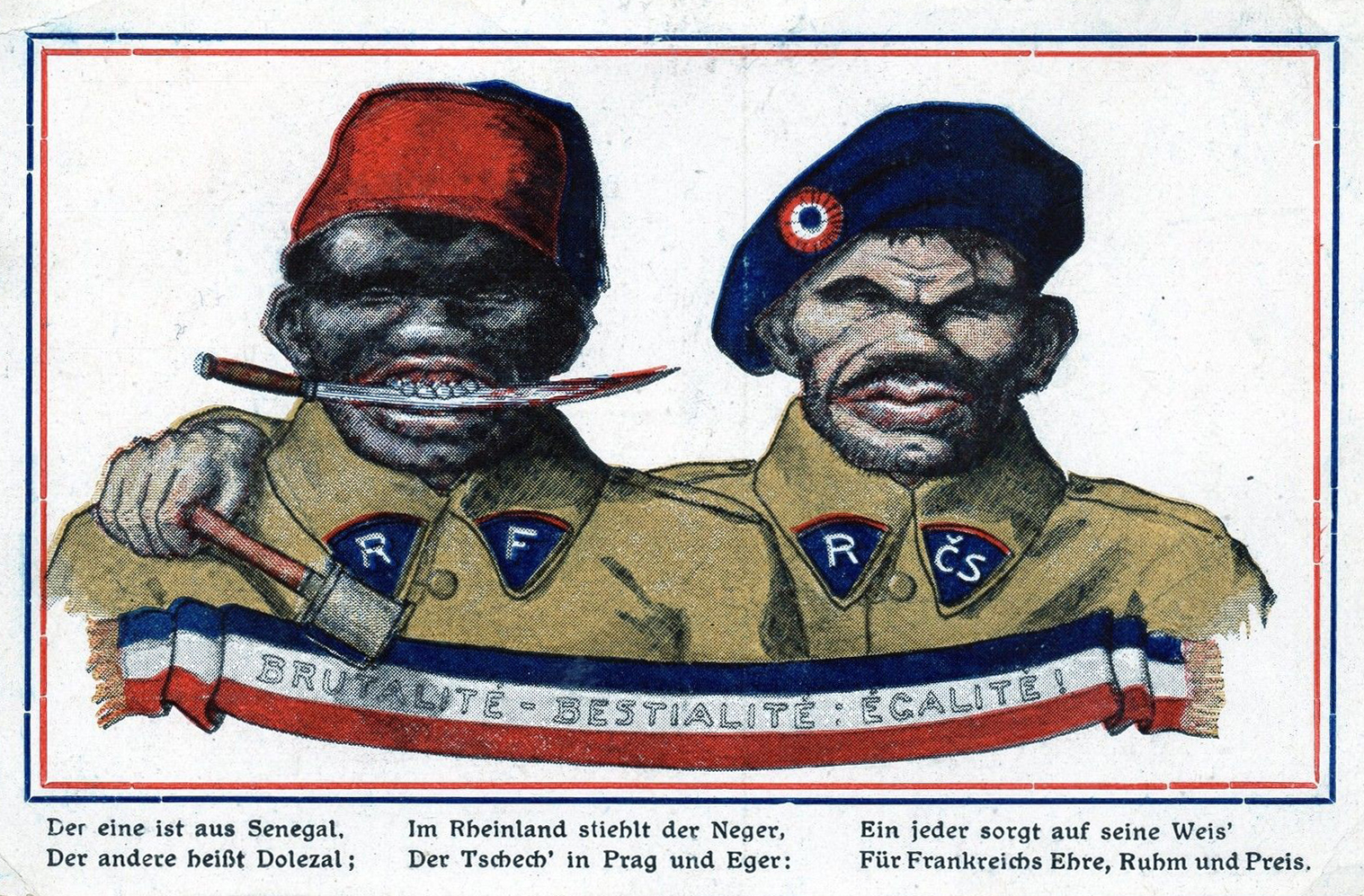
"Brutality, Bestiality, Equality". German postcard sent in January 1923, depicting a Senegalese soldier of the French army alongside a Czech one. The verse text reads: The one is from Senegal / The other's name is Dolezal (Doležal is a common Czech surname) / The Negro steals in the Rhineland / The Czech in Prague and Eger / Each in his way looks out for / France's honor, glory and praise.

The Black Horror on the Rhine was a moral panic perpetuated in Weimar Germany and elsewhere concerning allegations of widespread crimes, especially sexual crimes, supposedly committed by Senegalese and other African soldiers serving in the French Army during the French occupation of the Rhineland between 1918 and 1930. Die schwarze Schande or Die schwarze Schmach ("the Black Shame" or "the Black Disgrace") were terms used by right-wing press as German nationalist propaganda in opposition to these events. The colonial troops referred to were soldiers from Senegal, Indochina, and Madagascar.

The majority of colonial African soldiers were accused of committing rape and mutilation against the German population by government propaganda and newspapers, despite a lack of complaints in the region itself. The campaign reached its peak between 1920 and 1923, but did not stop until 1930. Adolf Hitler blamed Jews for bringing the Senegalese into the Rhineland. The stories of the Black Horror were racist hoaxes, and numerous inquiries by the French and American militaries and press found the claims were baseless.

Along with phrases like "the black scourge" and "black horror," these terms were used by campaigners in different countries beyond Germany, such as Canada, the United Kingdom, and the United States.

The term "black horror on the Rhine," coined by E. D. Morel, was mostly used in the English-speaking world. Children of mixed parentage were known as Rhineland bastards.

== Background ==
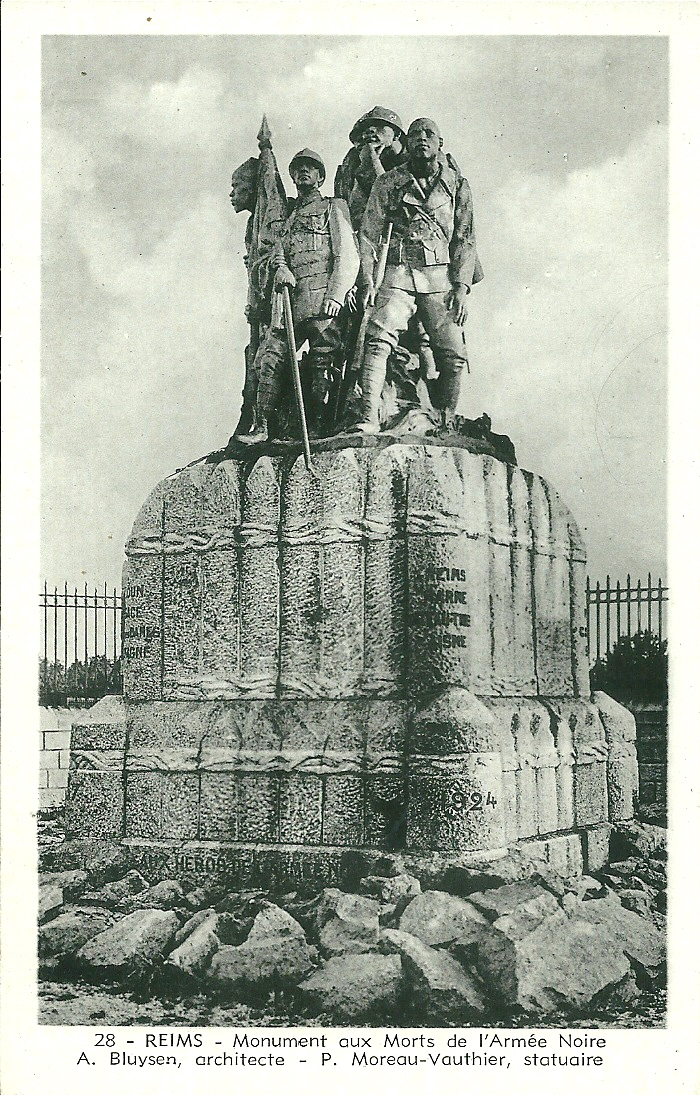
"To the heroes of the Black Army": Monument to Senegalese soldiers of the French army who successfully defended Reims in July 1918.

Following the Kiel Mutiny on 3 November 1918, German revolutionaries visited numerous cities across Germany announcing the German Revolution. The German Army had already experienced a series of mutinies, particularly since the failure of the German spring offensive which was brought to a halt in July 1918. French colonial soldiers played a significant role in defending the city of Reims which was under siege during the German attack. As one German writer put it, "It is not the French fighting at Reims. France has entrusted the protection of the ancient city of coronation to black and brown soldiers. It is true that the defence of Reims does not cost a drop of French blood, it is Negroes who are sacrificed."

By the evening of 6 November, two hundred German revolutionaries had reached the city of Cologne, where they joined local workers and soldiers to establish a Workers and Soldiers' Council, along the lines of the Russian soviets. When reports of this reached Wilhelm Groener, Deputy Chief of Staff of the Imperial German Army, he no longer supported Wilhelm II's plan to instigate a civil war, but rather joined the call of Friedrich Ebert, leader of the Majority Social Democratic Party of Germany (MSPD) for the Kaiser to abdicate. This the Kaiser did on 9 November, and Ebert became Chancellor of Germany the same day.

Thus the Rhineland had played a significant role in toppling the Kaiser and obliging the German state to accept the armistice. Likewise, the African soldiers of the French Army had played a significant role in the defeat of the Imperial German Army in the Second Battle of the Marne. This battle which was a decisive victory for the Allies, saw the French Army using a massed tank attack alongside forces of its Troupes coloniales (colonial army). Field Marshal Paul von Hindenburg wrote in his 1920 memoirs Mein Leben: "Where there were no tanks our enemy sent black waves against us. Waves of black Africans! Woe to us when these waves reached our lines and massacred or worse, tortured our defenseless men!" Notwithstanding this remark by the Chief of the German General Staff, the highly armed German Army used poison gas in attacks on French Colonial Troops in the battle of Reims. Hindenburg's view of the Senegalese was typical of German views of the Senegalese, and many German soldiers were reluctant to surrender to the Senegalese as they believed that they would be eaten by them, as racist propaganda portrayed the Senegalese as cannibals from "darkest Africa".

Ironically, German propaganda demonizing nonwhite colonial soldiers serving the Third French Republic was spread simultaneously with that of "The Cult of the Loyal Askari". In the latter campaign, the native African NCOs and enlisted men who had fought in the Schutztruppe under the command of General Paul von Lettow-Vorbeck during the East African Campaign were lionized as heroic and were depicted as still feeling loyal to Germany. This allowed both the right-wing parties and the government of the Weimar Republic to stir up support for demanding that the Allied Powers return the former German colonial empire.

== French use of colonial troops ==
Following the defeat of the Second French Empire by the Prussians in the Franco-Prussian War in 1871, a current of revanchism developed in France which sought to regain the lost territory of Alsace-Lorraine which had been ceded to the newly formed German Empire. Thus politicians such as Georges Clemenceau, of the Radical Republicans, opposed participation in the scramble for Africa as they were concerned it would divert the Republic from objectives related to regaining Alsace-Lorraine. Nevertheless, French officers repeatedly ignored orders, as they led the French Army on various campaigns in Africa. Charles Mangin, a career officer in the French Army with campaign experience in Africa, set out to resolve these conflicting imperialist strategies in his 1910 book La force noire (The Black Force). He argued that as Germany had a greater population and a higher birth rate than France in the early 20th century this meant that the German Army was always going to be larger than the French Army. He proposed that the French recruited extensively from their African colonies to provide an almost limitless source of manpower that could counter Germany's numerical superiority. Thus the expansion of the French colonial empire could be seen as complementing rather than competing with the desire to oblige Germany to return the lost territory.

=== Political dilemma of citizenship for French colonial soldiers ===
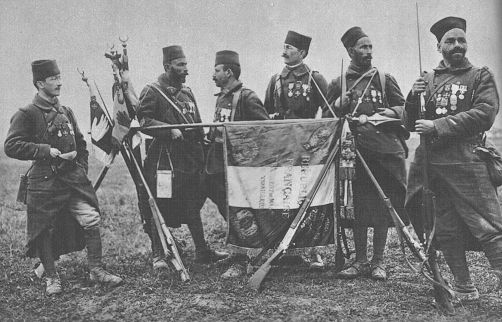
Soldiers of the 7th Algerian Tirailleurs Regiment in 1917

One of the products of the French Revolution was a concept of the nation linked to citizenship and military service. The levée en masse or forced mass military conscription was introduced in 1793 during the French Revolutionary Wars. This gave rise to the demand that by serving in the French Army, colonial subjects should gain full French citizenship. However, whilst military service provided a very clear expression of political allegiance to the state, French society had developed the idea of the statut personnel by which particularly French Muslims would have a distinct status, being governed by Koranic law administered by local religious authorities. As the norms of Islam permitted polygamy, this created what were considered insurmountable problems by those who defended an assimilationist viewpoint. Many of the assimilationists saw the culture and civilisation of France as something far superior to what they regarded as the barbaric customs of their non-European subjects. Another political current, the associationists advocated something along the lines of indirect rule as practised by the British. They saw the colonised subjects as having to find their own path to civilisation and relied on local elites to manage the colonial system on the ground. Both, however, viewed the subject peoples as being in debt to their conquerors, who by dominating them offered the allegedly profound benefits of French culture. Thus, despite the egalitarian ideology of the French Third Republic – which would theoretically exclude any color line – the development of French colonies created a quite different reality.

=== Election of Blaise Diagne ===
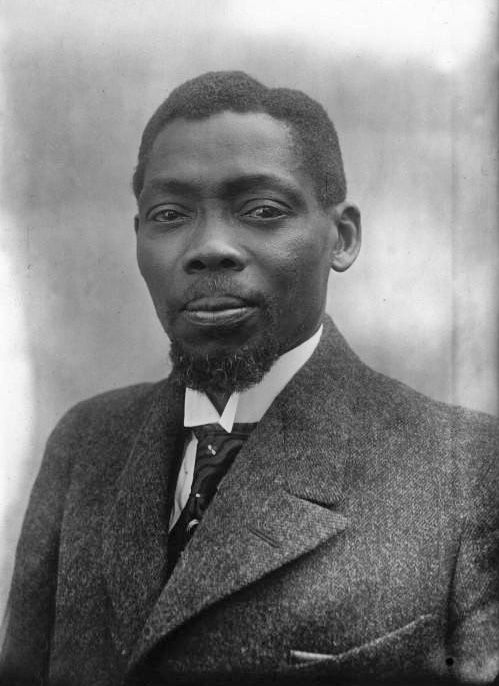
Blaise Diagne, Senegalese champion of citizenship for military service

The election of Senegalese politician Blaise Diagne in February 1914 to the French Chamber of Deputies provided a champion for the demand of citizenship rights being granted to France's colonial soldiers. Diagne represented the Four Communes, the four oldest colonial settlements in France's West African colonies which had been granted the right to send deputies to the Chamber of Deputies following the 1848 revolution as part of a policy known as "assimilation". The policy stipulated that indigenous subjects in France's colonial empire would be granted the same rights held by citizens of France as long as they assimilated to the French culture and language as part of the mission civilisatrice. In theory, this policy was intended to provide a measure of racial equality in the French colonial empire, though in reality de facto racial segregation continued to exist both in Metropolitan France and the colonies. Diagne was a prominent supporter of the policy of assimilation, and helped recruit numerous Africans into French military service.

Although Germany had also recruited soldiers in its African colonies both before and during World War I, the Allied blockade prevented any Askaris from fighting in Europe for Germany. During the war, German propaganda had often attacked the French for deploying African soldiers to fight in Europe, claiming that black men were innately savage and barbaric and it was unacceptable for the French to use Senegalese soldiers in Europe as it "endangered" European civilization.

Under the terms of the armistice which ended the fighting on the Western Front on 11 November 1918, the Allies had the right to occupy the Rhineland, and during the negotiations the Germans had specifically demanded that no African troops be included in the French occupation force. However, as the terms of the armistice were dictated to the Germans, this was of little import. Under the terms of the Treaty of Versailles, which was signed on 28 June 1919, the Allies had the right to occupy the Rhineland until 1935, though the last Allied troops were pulled out of the Rhineland in June 1930. German opposition to African troops being permanently stationed in Europe were shared by some in the English-speaking world, and both U.S. President Woodrow Wilson and the British Prime Minister David Lloyd George asked the French Premier Georges Clemenceau that no African soldiers be used as occupation troops in the Rhineland.

== Non-European troops arrive ==
The first non-European troops to arrive in Germany were soldiers from the Siamese Expeditionary Forces who arrived in Neustadt, in the Palatinate in December 1918. However, their presence which lasted until July 1919 did not cause great upset. Concerns were raised about the subsequent arrival of African troops in the Rhineland, first a regiment from Madagascar, and then the first Senegalese unit in May 1919. General Mangin had gone out of his way to ensure that African units were stationed as part of the Rhineland occupation force. The French deployed African soldiers to the Rhineland, in part not to ensure a build-up of black troops in France, and partly because the Germans had asked them not to be deployed. Mangin had insisted since the French were the victors, they were not going to be dictated to by the vanquished. For Diagne it was important that his fellow Senegalese be deployed to the Rhineland as a way of showing that they were equal and enjoyed the same respect as white French citizens. In a meeting with Clemenceau, Diagne had insisted that if French civilization was truly universal, then the Senegalese should be allowed to march into the Rhineland alongside the rest of the French Army and not be excluded simply because the Germans found them offensive. The Francophile Diagne, who believed in the ideal of France's "civilizing mission" in Africa, had played a key role in the recruitment of soldiers in Senegal to fight for France, and thus had more influence than his position as a mere Deputy might suggest. The "colored" troops in the Rhineland were conscripts from Algeria, Morocco, Tunisia, Senegal, Madagascar and French Indochina. At their peak, the "colored" soldiers were 14% of the French occupation force in the Rhineland.

== Rheinische Volkspflege and Rheinische Frauenliga ==
On 1 August 1919, an ultra-nationalist group called the Rheinische Volkspflege (Protectors of the Rhenish People) was founded with the purpose of seeking to turn public opinion against French support for the Rhenish separatism, and who hit upon the idea of using alleged crimes committed by blacks serving in the French Army as the best way to do so. Closely allied to the Rheinische Volkspflege was the woman's group, the Rheinische Frauenliga, which was founded in early 1920. The articles published by the Rheinische Frauenliga articulated "fantastical visions of imperialism and cultural decline", as the mass rapes alleged to be committed by the Senegalese became a metaphor for Franco-German relations. The Rheinische Frauenliga was in very close contact with E. D. Morel, a leading British radical liberal and an advocate of the viewpoint that the Treaty of Versailles was too harsh on Germany. Much of Morel's writing on the issue was based on reports provided to him by the Rheinische Frauenliga. Morel, a pacifist and member of the Labour Party, believed that black men had an uncontrolled sexuality that made them want to rape white women with abandon, and throughout his writings on the subject he accused the Senegalese of raping German women on an industrial scale, claiming that thousands upon thousands of German women and girls were raped by the Senegalese on a daily basis. The African-American historian Clarence Lusane accused Morel of leading "one of the most racist political campaigns to be launched in the first half of the 20th century".

== Responses to the Kapp Putsch ==
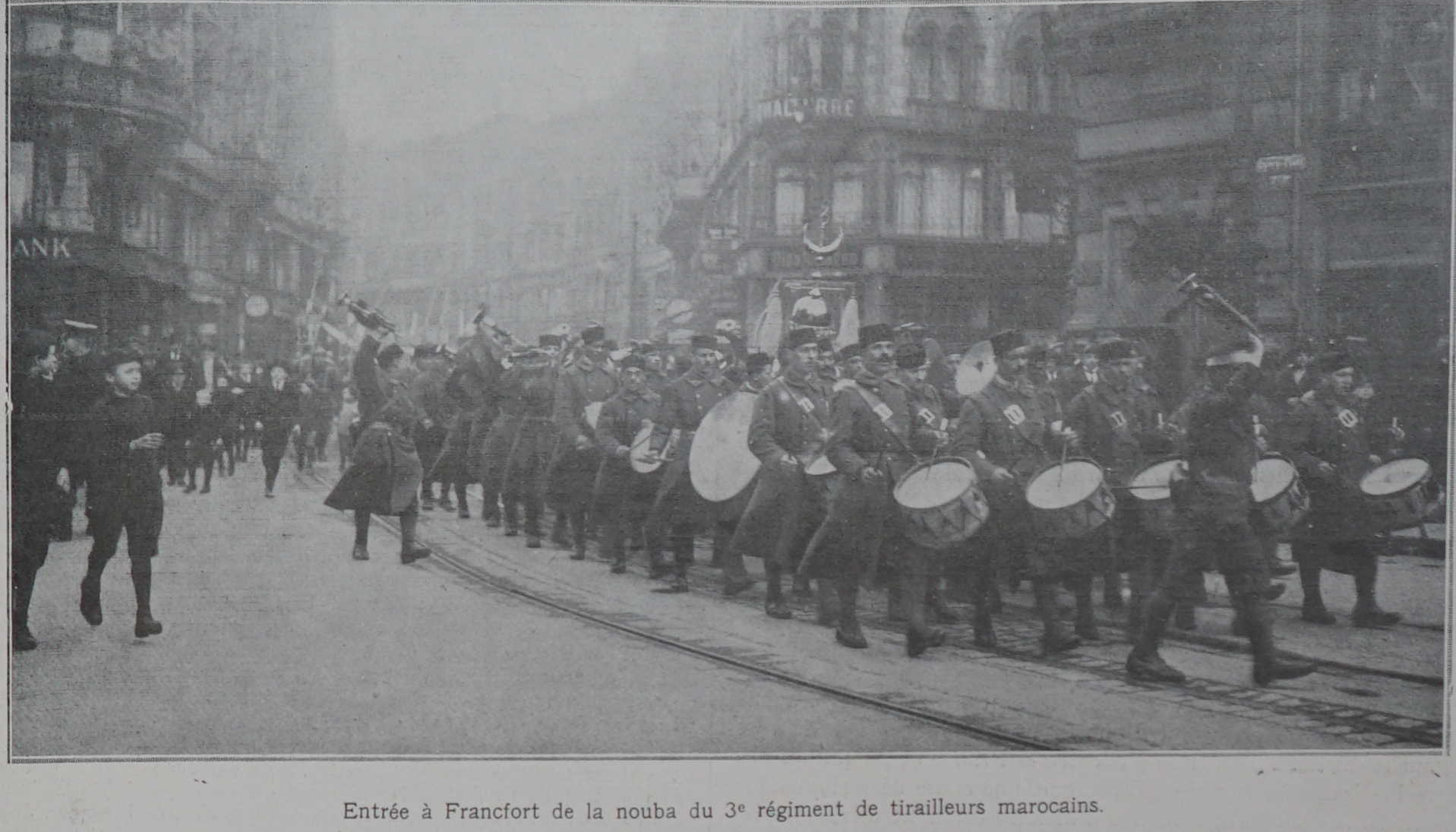
The band of the 3rd Moroccan Tirailleurs Regiment of the French Army as they marched into Frankfurt 6 April 1920

There was political turmoil in Germany when it came to signing the Versailles Treaty. In June 1919 Philipp Scheidemann, the first democratically elected Chancellor of Germany, resigned when faced with the Allied ultimatum that it should be signed with none of the changes the German government had requested. He was succeeded as Chancellor by Gustav Bauer. The terms of the treaty meant that the counter-revolutionary Freikorps which the Weimar government had created to crush the revolutionary movement faced being disbanded. Rather than submit to this, General Walther von Lüttwitz gathered significant Army officers around him and launched the Kapp–Lüttwitz Putsch. The success of the Putsch would open up a possibility of a recommencement of the First World War, a fact not lost on Marshal Foch.

Initially, there were only a few complaints from the German side about the presence of the Senegalese in the Rhineland, and not until April 1920 when the French used Moroccan soldiers to occupy Frankfurt that a hysterical campaign against the French use of "colored" soldiers began in Germany. The issue of the deployment of "colored" troops was first discussed in the Reichstag in January 1920. Ray Beveridge, a German-American woman living in Germany, had given a series of speeches in Hamburg and Munich in February–March 1920 warning of the dangers of miscegenation to "the purity of the German race" caused by the presence of the Senegalese in the Rhineland. E. D. Morel had written in a letter to the editor of The Nation on 27 March 1920 about the French who "thrust barbarians—barbarians belonging to a race inspired by Nature with tremendous sexual instincts into the heart of Europe".

In early April 1920, Germany violated the terms of the Treaty of Versailles by sending the Reichswehr into the demilitarized zone of the Rhineland, which led the French to occupy Frankfurt on 6 April 1920 as a reprisal, saying that they would not leave Germany's business capital until the Reichswehr left the demilitarized zone. One of the French Army units involved in occupying Frankfurt was a Moroccan company that fired into a crowd of demonstrators. Under the front-page of The Daily Herald on 9 April 1920, there was a cover story reporting on the occupation of Frankfurt by Morel whose title read: "Frankfurt runs red with blood French Black Troops Use Machine-guns on Civilians". The next day another front-page article by Morel had the title: "Black Scourge In Europe Sexual Horror Let Loose by France On Rhine Disappearance of Young German Girls". Morel wrote France is "thrusting her black savages into the heart of Germany", saying these "primitive African savages, the carriers of syphilis, have become a horror and a terror". As Morel was a man whose left-wing "credentials were unimpeachable" as he had gone to prison for opposing British involvement in the First World War, his articles attracted much attention both in Britain and abroad. Like many other British leftists, Morel was bitterly opposed to the Treaty of Versailles which he denounced as an unjust treaty which he blamed on a revanchist France.

In his 1919 book The Black's Man Burden, Morel had denounced the mandate system of the Treaty of Versailles for the former German colonies in Africa, writing that black people could not survive "modern capitalist exploitation". Morel wrote that "French militarists, whose schemes are a menace to the entire world" would use these "Negroes, Malagasies, Berbers and Arabs ... in the interest of a capitalist and militant Order". Specifically, Morel believed the French would use their African troops to put down strikes by the white working-classes in Europe, and the theme of the French Army's Senegalese soldiers as a brutal force upholding capitalism was a recurring one in Morel's articles in The Daily Herald in 1919 and 1920. Given Morel's views of the Senegalese and his opposition to the Treaty of Versailles, he was predisposed to believe any horror story that might come out of the Rhineland.

== Height of the campaign ==
The Federal Foreign Office, the German foreign ministry, saw a chance to turn international opinion against France over this issue, and in April 1920 began a sustained propaganda campaign against the French use of "colored" troops. The Federal Foreign Office issued "talking points" to German newspapers, which all through the spring of 1920 ran front-page stories accusing the Senegalese of all sorts of atrocities against German civilians. The stories about the Die schwarze Schand ("the black shame") appeared frequently in the German press in the spring of 1920, running what Nelson called hysterical stories with "astonishing" frequency. The German MSPD chancellor Hermann Müller in a speech complained that "Senegalese Negroes occupy the University of Frankfurt and guard the Goethe House!" The Foreign Minister, Dr. Adolf Köster, in a note to the Allied governments wrote: "if we should suffer from the occupation, we will accept the inferior discipline ... among your white troops if only you will rid us of this black plague!"

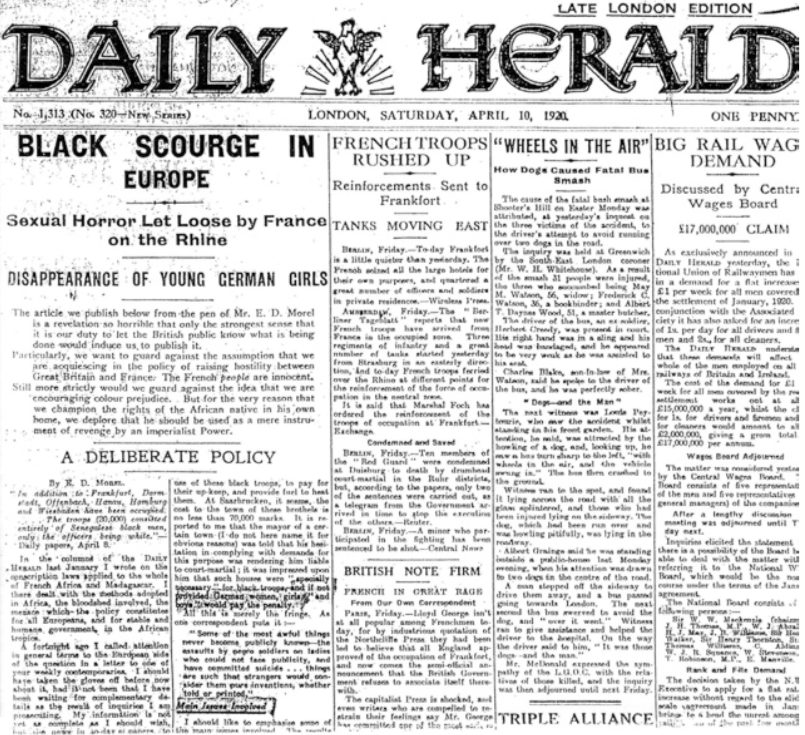
Morel's article in The Daily Herald on 10 April 1920 titled "Black Scourge in Europe"

Morel had published in the left-wing newspaper The Daily Herald on 10 April his "indictment of the colored outrages" in the Rhineland, which attracted much attention. Morel described the Senegalese soldiers during the First World War as "primitive African barbarians ... [who] stuffed their haversacks with eye-balls, ears and heads of the foe". Morel went on to write about "barely restrainable bestiality of the black troops" and depicted the Senegalese in the Rhineland as engaging in a reign of terror against German civilians, raping and killing without mercy. In an appeal to his female readers, Morel asked the question: "is there no obligation laid upon womenhood as such, in a matter of this kind which goes to the very root of any decent instinct the war may have left alive among the white peoples of the earth?" Morel wrote that "black savages" have uncontrolled sexual impulses that "must be satisfied upon the bodies of white women!" (emphasis in the original). Despite his claim not to hate black people, Morel wrote:

There they [the African soldiers] have become a terror and a horror unimaginable to the countryside, raping girls and women—for well known physiological reasons, the raping of a white woman by a negro is nearly always accompanied by serious injuries and not infrequently has fatal results; spreading syphilis, murdering inoffensive civilians, often getting completely out of control; the terrible barbaric incarnation of a barbarous policy, embodied in a so-called peace treaty which puts the clock back 2,000 years.

In a letter (editorial) written by the editor of The Daily Herald, George Lansbury approved of Morel's article and asked that France pull all African troops out of the Rhineland at once. On 12 April 1920, Lansbury wrote again on the subject, saying if the French did not send the Senegalese back to Africa at once, "we shall have savages used to blackleg, and to coerce, the workers of all European countries". On the same day, The Daily Herald's headlines read: "Brutes in French Uniforms. Danger to German women from 30,000 Blacks. Brothels not enough". The Central Committee of Women's Co-operative Guild in a statement expressed its "horror and indignation" at the use of Senegalese troops in the Rhineland, asked the British government to pressure the French government to send all African troops back to Africa and called for an international agreement to ban "the use of any native African troops by any European power". On 27 April 1920, a mass protest meeting was held in London that was organised jointly by all of the main British feminist groups, namely the Women's International League for Peace and Freedom, the National Federation of Women Workers, the Federation of Women Teachers, the Women's Co-operative Guild, the Association of Women Clerks and Secretaries and the Fabian Women's Group to condemn France for the alleged war crimes committed by the Senegalese. At the meeting, Morel asked: "that in the interests of good feeling between all the races of the world and the security of all women, this meeting calls upon the League of Nations to prohibit the importation into Europe for warlike purposes of troops belonging to primitive peoples."

Claude McKay, a Jamaican writer and industrial unionist who had arrived in London several months earlier, wrote a letter to The Daily Herald, which was not published, asking:

"Why this obscene maniacal outburst about the sex vitality of black men in a proletarian paper?" Rape is rape; the colour of the skin doesn't make it different. Negroes are no more over-sexed than Caucasians; mulatto children in the West Indies and America were not the result of parthenogenesis. If Negro troops had syphilis, they contracted it from the white and yellow races. As for German women, in their economic plight they were selling themselves to anyone. I do not protest because I happen to be a Negro ... I write because I feel that the ultimate result of your propaganda will be further strife and blood-spilling between whites and the many members of my race ... who have been dumped down on the English docks since the ending of the European war ... Bourbons of the United States will thank you, and the proletarian underworld of London will certainly gloat over the scoop of the Christian-Socialist pacifist Daily Herald.

Another letter to the editor of The Daily Herald which was published on 17 April 1920 came from the Africanist Norman Leys and criticized Morel for "his so-called physiological facts", which are "one of the great sources for racial hatred and should never be given currency".'

Morel's article received much attention and 50,000 Swedish women signed a petition which was presented at the French Embassy in Stockholm asking the French to withdraw their "savage" Senegalese soldiers from the Rhineland. In an article in The Labour Leader on 22 April 1920, Morel wrote that the African soldiers were the "passively obedient instrument of capitalist society" and a threat to the working classes of the nations of Europe. Reflecting his opposition to the Treaty of Versailles, Morel blamed the "black horror" on the French who deliberately committed this "supreme outrage" of sending these "tens of thousands of savage men" to the Rhineland. Morel predicated the "black horror" would cause another world war, writing that the average German boy was thinking: "Boys these men raped your mothers and sisters" (emphasis in the original). Labour Party politician and former general officer Christopher Thomson published an article in The Daily Herald, which stated that based on his previous service in Africa that he knew about the "sexual proclivities" of Africans "who in default of their own race must have intercourse with European women". Thomson denounced France for training "these savages" who are "being taught to despise the European races". On 14 April 1920, a Labour MP, Josiah Wedgwood, stated in the House of Commons that his party "did not consider Senegalese proper troops to garrison German towns" and asked the government to apply pressure on France to pull out the Senegalese. In the spring and summer of 1920, Labour MPs repeatedly raised the issue of the "black horror" in the Rhineland and demanded the government do something to force the French to pull out their African soldiers. In September 1920 at a meeting of the Trades Union Congress, free copies of Morel's pamphlet The Horror on the Rhine were handed to the delegates so that they learn about the "injustices" of Versailles and the "horrors" faced by the working class of the Rhineland.

On 30 April 1920, the left-wing Canadian newspaper, the British Columbia Federationist ran a front-paper cover story "The Black Scourge Is Now Ravaging Europe". The article began that the following story "was a revelation so horrible that only the strongest sense that it is our duty to let the public know what is being done would induce us to publish it". On 10 May 1920, the Prime Minister of Sweden, Hjalmar Branting, declared in a speech his belief in the truth of Morel's claims, saying that as a white man he was outraged that the French would deploy Senegalese troops in the Rhineland. In August 1920, Morel first used the phrase "the black horror on the Rhine" in one of his pamphlets to describe the alleged atrocities.

== Investigations of the claims ==
In the United States, so many letters had been received by outraged citizens that President Wilson in June 1920 asked Secretary of State Bainbridge Colby, to have the American ambassador in Paris, Hugh Campbell Wallace, investigate these stories. General Henry T. Allen, the commander of the American occupation force in Coblenz, together with the diplomat E.L. Dresel, carried out an investigation and reported on 25 June 1920 that almost all of the stories about the "black horror on the Rhine" were baseless. Dresel wrote that nearly all of the stories about atrocities were untrue and General Allen praised the "good discipline" of the Senegalese. Both men concluded that the stories about the "black horror on the Rhine" were invented to influence U.S. public opinion. After the Red Summer of 1919, which had seen widespread racial violence, especially race riots, across the United States causing hundreds of deaths, most of them African-American, white American public opinion was very sensitive to stories about "uppity" blacks getting out of hand, and was inclined to sympathize with those who claimed to be threatened by blacks. The U.S. government did not choose to make Dresel's and Allen's reports public at the time.

A reporter for The Nation, Lewis Gannett, who went to the Rhineland to investigate the allegations, found them to be mostly false. Gannett found that there had been cases of rape of German women and girls by the Senegalese, but the total number was far smaller than what had been alleged by Morel; that white French troops had also raped German women, a matter that did not interest Morel very much; and that in rape cases "the French have inflicted severe punishment upon all soldiers guilty of transgressing against the civil population." A study done by the British journalist J. Ellis Barker published in the July 1921 edition of Current History found that between 1918 and 1921 there had been a total of 72 creditable allegations of criminal conduct made against "colored troops" in the Rhineland, and of which only 9 concerned allegations of rape. Baker's study also listed 96 allegations of criminal conduct which had been judged "doubtful" and 59 which were found to be "unjustified." The German journalist Maximilian Harden claimed that the sex between "colored" soldiers in the French Army and German women in the Rhineland was mostly consensual, writing: "German women were chiefly responsible for the mingling of colored and white blood which has taken place by the Rhine."

The German historian Christian Koller in an exhaustive study of complaints made by the Rhinelanders against "colored" French occupation forces found that most of the complaints were of a petty nature, such as playing unauthorized football games in parks. Most of the complaints about violence by "colored" soldiers in Worms involved Moroccans, usually brawls in the streets, and Koller found that complaints about sexual violence from the Senegalese were "rare", with the mayor of Worms actually wanting the "well disciplined" Senegalese to stay rather than be replaced by the more combative Moroccans. In Wiesbaden, relations between the Rhinelanders and the French occupation forces were more tense with references to brawls, property damage and "four cases of death caused by the colored troops," which was less than those that white French troops were accused of. Koller also noted the vague nature of the "black horror" claims and that when it came to specifics, many of the claims of rape by the Senegalese have a "sameness" to not only the accounts of the alleged rapes, but even the same words and phrasing, which led Koller to conclude that the accounts were almost certainly fabricated. On the whole, Koller found that there were isolated cases of rape by "colored" soldiers, but there was nothing to support the claim of a reign of terror in the Rhineland by "colored" forces. The historian Raffael Scheck wrote most German newspapers outside of the Rhineland ran the "Black Horror" stories, but in fact it seems that relations between the "colored" troops and the Rhinelanders were "mostly friendly, sometimes too friendly for the critics" as some Rhenish women gave birth to illegitimate children with African, Berber, Arab and Asian features, disparaged through the term "Rhineland Bastards".

In the summer of 1920, Morel visited the Rhineland to investigate the matter himself, and in August 1920, he published his pamphlet The Horror on the Rhine. Within a month, all 5,000 copies of The Horror on the Rhine had sold out and by April 1921 there had been 8 editions of The Horror on the Rhine. The third edition of The Horror on the Rhine was endorsed by the former German chancellor Prince Max of Baden, Jean Longuet of the French Socialist Party, four Socialist members of the Italian parliament and General C. B. Thomson. In The Horror on the Rhine, Morel wrote about black men having an uncontrolled, fierce sexuality that made them want to rape white women. Morel wrote: "In ones or twos, sometimes in parties, big, stewart men from the warmer climes, armed with sword-bayonets or knives, sometimes with revolvers, living unnatural lives of restraint, their fierce passions hot within them, roam the countryside." The African-American philosopher Alain LeRoy Locke visited the Rhineland to investigate Morel's claims and found them mostly baseless. Locke also interviewed the soldiers of the French Army, which he praised as a multi-racial force when skin color did not matter, and stated the morale of the Senegalese was holding up well.

== International reception ==
The claims made by the German government did influence American public opinion. Dudley Field Malone, the leader of the Farmer–Labor Party, wrote to President Wilson that: "thoughtful persons in America and throughout the world are horrified by the victimization of German women and girls by half-savage African troops". The French writer Romain Rolland issued a statement approving of Morel's articles and declared: "The incredible blindness of statesmen who without realizing it are turning Europe over to the black and yellow continents, which they are armed with their own hands, is itself the unconscious instrument of Destiny". Lothrop Stoddard, a professor at Harvard, an avowed eugenist and white supremacist, had just published his best-selling book The Rising Tide of Color Against White World-Supremacy, warning of a black-Asian threat against what he called "World-wide White Supremacy". Upon reading Morel's The Horror on the Rhine, Stoddard promptly issued his approval, warning of the "extreme fecundity" of blacks and that "black blood, once entering a human stock, seems never to really bred out again".

In October 1920, a debate took place at a conference of Protestant clergymen at the World Ecumenical Conference in Geneva, when a Lutheran pastor from Germany asked the conference to condemn the "black horror". The African-American Reverend John R. Hawkins, representing the African Methodist Episcopal church from Washington D.C. said in response: "It was most unfortunate ... he should take occasion to drag into this place for high and lofty sentiments the slime and venom of the monster, colour prejudice ... Crimes committed by soldiers drunk with the feeling of resentment and the passions of bloody battles have followed all wars; there is no reason for making this invidious distinction and holding up the coloured troops alone to be guilty of such atrocities ... The dusky sons of Ham, whether from Africa or America, have come to Europe are among the bravest of the brave and the noblest of the noble, and I will not be silent while their record is attacked."

The Christian Science Monitor (CSM) in an editorial on 28 October 1920 wrote: "France has gone even further than an eye-for-eye and has outplayed Germany at its worst, in a way so terrible that it is impossible to indulge in details". Two weeks later, the Christian Science Monitor retracted the editorial after receiving a letter from the French consul in Koblenz who showed that the total number of Senegalese in the Rhineland were 5000, not the 50,000 alleged by the Christian Science Monitor. There had been a total of only 13 reported cases of rape of German women by the Senegalese, not the thousands alleged by the CSM. In all 13 cases, the rapists had been sentenced to death after being convicted with the consul noting sharply that the French Army did not tolerate rapists in its ranks. The Auswärtige Amt seeing that the stories about the "black horror on the Rhine" were effective in gaining international sympathy for the Reich greatly increased its propaganda with pamphlets detailing the alleged war crimes committed by the Senegalese being published in English, Dutch, French, Italian, Spanish and Portuguese. The Auswärtige Amt attached so much importance to the promoting the "Black Horror on the Rhine" stories that the German embassies in Lima and Santiago were ordered to make publicizing Die schwarze Schand their main priority. Nelson described the pamphlets handed out by the German diplomats—some of which were written by "cranks", and which verged on the pornographic in their depiction of fair German girls being raped by brutish Africans—as presenting a long list of rapes said to be committed by the Senegalese against German women and girls on the orders of their French officers. In 1921, a film was produced in Munich about the "black horror on the Rhine" that played all over Germany and in the Netherlands. In June 1921, Beveridge gave a speech at the Sagebiel Hall in Hamburg attended by some 50,000 people during she accused the Senegalese of raping thousands of German women and girls since they had arrived in the Rhineland.

Much of the fury that the "colored" troops generated in Germany was due to the way that they inverted the normal racial hierarchy with black, brown and Asian men holding power over white Germans. A recurring theme of German complaints against the Senegalese was that Germany had now been "colonized" by Africans. A German writer, Alfred von Wrochem, in his best-selling book The Colonization of the Rhineland by France had attacked the French for undermining belief in worldwide white supremacy by using Senegalese troops. During World War I, the presence of Africans fighting in the French Army had in the word of the British historian Barbara Bush had made "trans-racial sex between white women and black men of all classes an obsession with white men". The stationing of Senegalese troops in the Rhineland had tapped into these fears. The British ambassador to Germany, Lord D'Abernon wrote: "The war increased the German's respect for, and his dislike of the English, but has done nothing to diminish his belief in his own superior sturdiness compared with the French. This will continue subconsciously and subcutaneously whatever happens-even though France possesses an overpowering army and the Germans have no organised means of resistance". A theme of much the "black horror" propaganda was that of a massive contempt for the French who had to use "colored" troops to fight their wars. One of the leading "black horror" propagandists, August Ritter von Eberlein, wrote: "Without her colored troops, France is not in a position in the present tense situation to maintain her militarism and imperialism".

The fear of sexuality of black men was especially felt very strongly by white feminists and throughout the 1920s, feminist publications in the United States and the United Kingdom presented the "black horror on the Rhine" stories as true. An interesting exception was when Canadian newspaper The British Columbia Federationist ran an article in October 1920 titled "France Creates Hell West of the Rhine", accusing the Senegalese soldiers of committing "numberless outrages against women and girls". The Canadian historian Peter Campbell noted that the "fascinating aspect" was that there were no letters to the editor of the British Columbia Federationist expressing either approval or disapproval; which he noted was odd given the way in which the article appealed to the prejudices in the most base way, suggesting that the largely white, working-class readers of British Columbia Federationist did not approve of the anti-black message. In France, a French Socialist Charles Gide wrote on 16 March 1921 edition of the newspaper Foi et Vie that Morel claimed that he wanted to protect the Africans, but: "le genre de protection de M. Morel rappelle un peu le precepte que fait afficher la Society protectrice des animaux: 'Soyez bons pour les betes'" (Mr. Morel's kind of protection is a little reminiscent of the precepts of the Society for the Protection of Animals: 'Be good to the animals').

One group founded in Munich in September 1921 to campaign against the "black horror" was the Notbund led by Heinrich Distler. Known for its enthusiastic hyperbole and its usually false claims, the Notbund's pamphlets claimed the Senegalese were raping 100 women/per day in the Rhineland and the Malagasy had caused epidemics of tuberculosis, dysentery, syphilis, malaria, Malta fever, leprosy, Phagedänismus and parasitic worms in the Rhineland. Appealing to the medical ignorance of its readers, the Notbund maintained that it was possible to contract leprosy solely by being in the presence of a black man without even touching him. Author and historian Norman Angell in his 1921 book The Fruits of Victory wrote the worst aspect of the Treaty of Versailles was the stationing of the Senegalese in the Rhineland. Angell accused the French of putting "cannibals from the African forests" into the "cultured" university towns of the Rhineland.

== Racial fears ==
The motivations of the "black horror" writers differed greatly. The German sociologist Iris Wigger divided the writers into two types; a "liberal racism" that embraced writers such as E. D. Morel and the former Italian Prime Minister Francesco Saverio Nitti who used the "black horror" stories primarily as a weapon for attacking the Treaty of Versailles, and a "conservative racism" that embraced figures such as the German writer Guido Kreutzer and the American actress Ray Beveridge mainly found within Germany that used the "black horror" stories primarily as a weapon for attacking the Weimar Republic.

=== Racism on the left ===
In Morel's own mind, he was an anti-racist who was fighting for the Africans. Morel believed that Africans were far closer to nature than Europeans and as such, the Africans had "the uneducated soul of the savage" and were not up to the demands of modern industrial society. As such, Morel believed that blacks being creatures of "strong emotions" needed to be protected from "modern civilization" which they were allegedly not capable of handling, which explained his campaigning against the Congo Free State which tried to bring modern work discipline to the Congo in the early 20th century. At the same time, Morel believed that Africans, lacking the self-discipline of whites, had an uncontrolled sexuality. In a 1911 essay after visiting Nigeria, Morel had written the "reproduction" of the black race was the main "obsession" of all black people, writing about the "instinctive and mysterious" call of racial need which supposedly made all black people obsessed with sex all the time to the exclusion of everything else, declaring that "sexual obsession" was the "elementary racial desire" of black people. In this viewpoint, as long as Africans were left in their "natural savage state", all would be well as Africans were not capable of meeting the sexual self-discipline of Europeans, which is why Morel condemned the efforts of missionaries in Africa. Through Morel had been very forceful in condemning the cruel exploitation of the Congo Free State, Morel believed in imperialism, just not the cruel exploitative imperialism of the Congo Company, writing it was the duty of whites to serve as the "trustees" for blacks and the "great white father" who would protect the "basic human rights" of Africans while at the same time accepting the "infantile" nature of black people who were not the equal in any way of whites.

Morel in 1922

Morel was very anti-French not only because of his opposition to the Treaty of Versailles, but because of the nature of France's mission civilisatrice ("civilizing mission") in Africa whereby any African who was willing to embrace the French language and culture would become French and theoretically the equal of whites, which threatened to upend Morel's beliefs in the essential biological inferiority of blacks. Morel believed that the Africans were committing outrageous crimes against Germans in the Rhineland because the French had empowered them by least theoretically making them into black Frenchmen who were just as much citizens of the republic as anyone else. Precisely because Morel believed in the uncontrolled sexuality of blacks, it was self-evident to him that the "sexually uncontrolled and uncontrollable" Senegalese would run amok in the Rhineland, raping every German female in sight. As part of his call for international solidarity with a Germany alleged to be victimized by the Treaty of Versailles, Morel wrote: "For the working classes the importation of Negro mercenaries by the hundred thousand from the heart of Africa, to fight the battles and execute the lusts of capitalist governments in the heart of Europe is ... a terrific portent. The workers, alike in Britain, France, and Italy will be ill-advised if they allow it to pass in silence because today the victims happen to be German." Morel used the alleged massive sexual violence committed against women in the Rhineland as a call for racial togetherness, writing it was in the interests of all white peoples to assist Germany with revising the terms of Versailles which permitted the "black horror on the Rhine". In the same way, Morel used the "black horror" as a way of attacking France which had caused a "sexual horror on the Rhine" and whose "reign of terror" was a "giant evil" that should inspire "shame into all four corners of the world" and ultimately should "a revision of the Versailles Treaty and the relief for Germany."

Nitti, a liberal Italian politician was known for his calls for a "United States of Europe," believing that only when all of the nations of Europe become one would all of the problems of modern Europe be solved. In this regard, Nitti was strongly opposed to the Treaty of Versailles, which he called the "instrument of oppression" against Germany, the "most cultured nation" in the world. As part of his critique of Versailles, Nitti wrote that the French had put the most "backward nations" in the Rhineland, declaring some of the "most cultured cities in Europe" that been subjected to "Negro violence" and to "physical and moral trials unknown for centuries in civilized countries". Nitti wrote the occupation of the Rhineland "had no military aim" but rather was an "attempt to force Germany to the point of moral exhaustion". At the same time, Nitti, who was very well worried about the prospect of a Communist revolution in Germany, used the "black horror" stories as a way of creating unity in Germany, urging that all Germans regardless of class should unite in the common struggle against France. As part of his call for European unity, Nitti went out of his way to portray France's African soldiers as an alien body that did not belong in Europe at all, which allowed him to condemn France as the nation responsible for this state of affairs. Nitti wrote the Senegalese were guilty of "any form of violence and crime" as they were "yesterday the representatives of cannibalistic races" who were now occupying the "country of the greatest thinkers in Europe". Throughout his speeches and essays, Nitti drew a contrast between Europeans who constituted civilization vs Africans who represented barbarism. Nitti even went so far as to say he was shocked to see and hear "music gangs of Negroes and Berbers of Africa" play "African music programmes" on the "squares of the occupied cities". Nitti wrote for him it "seemed unbearable" that Germans whose nation was a "cradle of musical genius" should listen to "Negro music". As part of his call to revise Versailles, Nitti urged that the other European nations together with the United States were under the obligation to "save culture ... from the flood of barbarism" as "Germany's fall" would mean "the downfall of one [of] the largest driving forces of humanity". As part of his demand for a pan-Western effort to save Germany, Nitti wrote he could hear the "cry of pain of the German woman", which he wrote was a "most terrible accusation against Christian peoples," who called themselves "civilized and democratic."

Wigger stated that writers on both sides were equally racist, but there was a difference between those as Morel and Nitti whose main interest was in revising the terms of Versailles in Germany's favor, and those like Kreutzer and Beveridge whose main interest was in proving the Weimar Republic was too "weak" to stand up to France. The same conclusion was reached by the British historian Peter Collar who wrote: "... there existed in Germany a fundamental disagreement over the value of propaganda and the use to which it might be put. To the idealists of the new Republic it offered a way for Germany to advance her cause abroad in the widest sense and to get away from the excesses of the Wilhelmine era ... The Right saw things quite differently. In the far Right, exemplified in party political terms by the DNVP and by some within the Bavarian BVP, there existed a deep desire to return to past authoritarian certainty, a past that was idealised in the imagination. The concepts behind the new Republic were totally alien and were to be opposed at every opportunity." The campaign against the "black horror" was not one campaign coordinated by the Reich government, but several different campaigns launched by the Reich, Bavarian, and Prussian governments together with a number of private groups. With the notable exceptions of the Communists and Independent Social Democrats, every political group in Germany endorsed the "black horror" campaign though Collar described the Majority Social Democratic Party of Germany more as "fellow travelers in the propaganda war rather than a driving force". Racism was so pervasive in Europe at the time that the "black or colored man was generally considered by the white European to be his inferior".

=== Racism on the right ===
Ray Beveridge, a conservative Germanophile American actress and an ardent racist, used the "black horror" story as a call for a right-wing Volksgemeinschaft ("people's community"), urging the German people to reject the Weimar republic and rally around the völkisch right, which she claimed were the only men capable of "standing up" to France. Beveridge, who was well known for her exaggerated claims and a speaking style that sought to appeal to the worst prejudices in her audience, often spoke about the "mindless blacks" with "enormous sex drives and unrestrained passion" who allegedly would attack "white women, white girls, white youth, often old people and even children". Beveridge usually began her speeches with the remark:

"Why do I come here, an American, to speak to you about the Schwarze Schmach ["black shame"]? Because I come from a nation that ever since it came into being has been threatened by black and yellow problems and the black and yellow peril! ... I appeal to women in the world! I appeal to all men worthy of the name. Help! White women, white boys are in danger everyday, every hour of the day as long as a black is allowed to have power over a white women!"

An avowed white supremacist, Beveridge sought to impute the worst about black men, saying in one speech:

"Victims of the promiscuous passions of the blacks are found half dead in meadows and ditches, their clothes in tatters, their delicate young bodies torn by the brutality of the attacks. Many have bite wounds which show clearly how wildly the black beast has fallen on his victim. I could quote innumerable examples with names and dates; and it must not be forgotten that almost all these men are infected with venereal diseases".

Beveridge's speeches were well attended and are described in contemporary newspaper reports as being greeted with huge applause, but others involved in the "black horror" campaign like Margarete Gärtner, the chairwoman of the Rheinische Frauenliga, regarded Beveridge as a liability as she was prone to making exaggerated and false claims in her speeches that were easily rebutted by the French. The Auswärtige Amt in a report stated that Beveridge was harming the German side as she "outdoes the Notbund in her hysterical extremes". Collar called Beveridge the most extreme of all the speakers on the theme of the "black horror", describing her as the preferred spokeswoman of the "extreme right" in Germany with her speeches being "nothing less than an incitement to racial hatred". In one of her speeches, Beveridge said: "Your weapons have been taken from you, but there still remains a rope and a tree. Take up the natural arms which our men from the South resort: lynch! Hang every black who assaults a white person!" Collar wrote that Beveridge, who was fluent in German, was a "charismatic orator ... able to whip up her audience into a frenzy". Linking all this together was Bevridge's call for the Volksgemeinschaft, saying that the "German spirit, the German science, the German culture, and the German work" were more than enough to defeat France, provided that all Germans stand "faithfully together" and put the nation ahead of "party politics". In a speech in a Munich beerhall, Beveridge declared: "Germans unite-unity is power-only with power can you shake the chains of Versailles!".

As part of her appeal, Beveridge spoke of the need to keep the Volkskörper (the collective "racial body" of the German people) pure, and as such German women as the bearers of the next generation of Germans were the most important part of the Volkskörper. In Beveridge's mind, the alleged sexual crimes against German women were bad enough, but even worse by threatening the Volkskörper threatened the very existence of the "German race". For Beveridge, the purity of the Volkskörper was so important that any man who did not fight against the "black horror" was not only a "slacker" and "traitor of his country", but also a "traitor against the white race." Beveridge often spoke of her "shame" for the "German race" who was not willing "to protect" the "honour" of its women from the Fremdkörper (alien body) that was now threatening the Volkskörper in the Rhineland. At the time of the Munich Beerhall putsch, Beveridge came out in support for the National Socialists, declaring it "an enormous honor" to mobilise, together with her German husband, "the Chiemgau for Adolf Hitler". At the time, Beveridge had said in a speech that Hitler together with General Erich Ludendorff were her "German heroes". Beveridge later on in the 1930s renounced her U.S. citizenship to become a German citizen, joined the NSDAP, and was a well known "admirer of Hitler"."

Likewise, the völkisch German writer Guido Kreutzer used the "black horror on the Rhine" as a way of attacking both what he saw as the "unjust" Treaty of Versailles and even more so the Weimar Republic, which was too "weak" to stand up to France. In his very popular 1921 novel Die Schwarze Schmach: Der Roman des geschändeten Deutschlands (The Black Shame A Novel of Disgraced Germany), Kreutzer portrayed the Senegalese and Moroccan soldiers as thuggish rapists who violate thousands upon thousands of innocent German girls in the Rhineland, who have all the stereotypical "Aryan" look with fair skin, blonde hair and blue eyes; the hero of the novel repeatedly calls the Senegalese "nigger scum". The preface to Die Schwarze Schmach was written by the völkisch activist Count Ernst zu Reventlow who praised the novel as a much needed call for the Volksgemeinschaft. Reventlow wrote that Jesus Christ had taught all Christians to love their neighbor, which he took to mean all Germans should love the Rhinelanders and hate the French, writing:

"It is this national hatred that we need! It must pulsate evenly throughout the German people, uniting them and driving them forward. This hatred of an entire people, despite a lack of weapons, will build an insuperable force and, from a certain moment in time, an irresistible one. It must act everywhere and at every moment against the French interloper. In the long term, no conqueror has ever been able to withstand such hatred and at this time in Germany the conqueror is not even there by virtue of his own power."

In this regard, Reventlow complained that the German people were far too disunited at present, and needed to become united by hating the French, which was why he recommended reading the novel.

Kreutzer used Die Schwarze Schmach as a way of attacking the Weimar Republic which is portrayed as a weak and ineffective in face of the "black horror on the Rhine", and called for Germans to embrace a "strongman" leader who would rule as a dictator. The cover of Die Schwarze Schmach featured an ape-like black man wearing the uniform of a French Army private holding a half-naked white woman with a lascivious expression on his face. The hero of the novel is Baron von Yrsch, an aristocrat, former Prussian Army general, war hero and a friend of the former Emperor Wilhelm II who lives on his estate outside of an unnamed town in the Rhineland together with his beautiful daughter, whom the Senegalese naturally want to rape. Yrsch complains about the weak Emperor who abdicated and left into exile while leaving his 70 million loyal subjects "in the abyss". Reflecting his nationalistic views, Kreutzer has a French officer say: "The German Army was the moral victor. Only numerical superiority and hunger had finally forced it to its knees. France by itself would have been overrun by Germany in less than four weeks without being able to offer any serious resistance". To humiliate Yrsch, the French demand they be allowed to open a brothel on the grounds of his estate to be operated by his daughter Marlene. The Moroccans serving in the French Army are described as having "a rough-hewn black-brown face; bulging yellowish eyes buried deep under the forehead beneath the steel helmet; the predator teeth dazzlingly bright between the burning red lips".

Another supporting character is Lampré, the son of a Rhineland industrialist and a Rhenish separatist who initially collaborates with the French, but sees the error of his ways when confronted with the "black horror" and in the climax of the novel saves Yrsch's daughter from being raped by a "mulatto" French Army officer by killing him. When the collaborating mayor orders Yrsch out of the town, thousands of the Burschenschaften (student fraternities) join forces with the town's workers in a demonstration to persuade him to stay. The villain of the novel is the "mulatto" Captain Mustapha Hassan of the French Army; the fact that "half-Arabian" Hassan is a Muslim, the self-proclaimed "black raven of Allah", who is a descendant of Muslim warriors who fought against the Crusades was meant by Kreutzer to show that France is not longer a "civilized" European Christian nation, but has rather become a "mulatto" nation that has rejected the values of the European family of nations. In an important symbolic moment, when Captain Hassan tries to rape Yrsch's daughter and Lampré comes to her defense, Hassan's white chauffeur fires a shot at him with his revolver that instead shoots off a finger of a statue of Christ in front of a church, thereby showing the French have turned their backs on Christian Europe. In another important scene, Lampré confronts his Rhenish separatist father to tell him that he "wants to be German again" rather than associate with the "niggers" of France. Lampré's industrialist father is portrayed as blinded by greed and he has to decide to support Rhenish separatism out of the potential to make millions from working with the French. Ultimately, Lampré's father sees the error of his ways and he too rediscovers his pride in being German again. The Lamprés pere and fils represent the elegantly cosmopolitan and Francophile Catholic middle classes of the Rhineland who often resented Prussian militarism as crude and overbearing, seeing themselves as a more civilized type of German.

Kreutzer also used Die Schwarze Schmach as a way of reinforcing traditional gender roles as German women are portrayed as weak and passive, unable to protect themselves from the rampaging Senegalese and Moroccans, needing the "manly" German men to protect them. Using völkisch language, Kreutzer called for all Germans to feel for their "tormented volksgenossen" (national comrades) in the Rhineland, rediscover their "national source of strength" by uniting against the common foe, and allow "the völkisch spark to spread". In the novel, the bodies of German women represent both literally and symbolically the tormented German nation attacked by African "savages" with the female body serving as a symbol of German racial purity. Significantly, the children born to German mothers and Senegalese fathers are all born "physically and morally degenerate" and are not considered to be German. Furthermore, all of the women raped by the Senegalese cease to be German the moment they are raped, and it is made clear that there is no place in the Volksgemeinschaft for them. Kreutzer accuses France of seeking to "undermine the nation's health" by allowing African soldiers to "rape and defile" German women, who are portrayed as virtuous, wholesome and chaste symbols of German racial purity, blessed with the sacred task of bearing the next generation of Germans.

Lampré rejects his French lover, a licentious dancer and a "worldly little animal" whose "soulless chirping voices" and overt sexuality he finds repulsive for the more wholesome and German figure of Marlene von Yrsch. Marlene von Yrsch is blessed with all the beauty of her "race", having a "girly pristine charm", blonde hair worn in a "Greek node", "wise eyes", an "elegantly narrow face" with beautiful "curved brows" and a "slim shape" to her body. Marlene von Yrsch is a symbol of not only Germany, but also of the white race in general, marking out the all that was beautiful in the world vs. the hideously deformed bodies of the Senegalese, Moroccan and Indonchinese soldiers serving in the French Army. The mere sight of her causes Lampré to desert from the French Foreign Legion as he sees in her a "woe reminder of the fatherland lost forever" as his mind is flooded with images of his lost Heimat, filling him with "shame" for having fought for France. By contrast, Captain Mustapha Hassan is portrayed as a sexual predator with "primitively carved features" and a "brutal" sexuality, an ugly man with beady lips who "bites like an animal" at the sight of Marlene. When Marlene rejects his advances, calling him a "half-civilized savage" with "all the arrogance of her race", he becomes obsessed with raping her in revenge. Lampré vows to protect Marlene, saying she will not be "fair game for this nigger", saying his "conscience as a human being and a man" will not let do otherwise and thereby redeems himself for his "treason" for having fought for France in the Foreign Legion.

Finally, Kreutzer used Die Schwarze Schmach as a way of attacking the Social Democrats as group of working class characters in the Rhineland in the novel ultimately abandoned the SPD as they find it is only right-wing leaders like Yrsch who can create the Volksgemeinschaft that will allow Germany to stand up to France. Reflecting Kreutzer's conservative politics, in Die Schwarze Schmach, the working class characters finally learn the SPD is a divisive force that weakens the German people by dividing the working class from the rest of the German people, and it is when the Rhenish working class learn to accept leadership from traditional elites such as the aristocracy and the industrialists that the German people can finally be united as one in the form of the Volksgemeinschaft to stand up to France, Germany's ancient archenemy which was responsible for the "black horror on the Rhine". In the novel, the working class march under the "old black-white-red flags" to protest the "black horror" and the expulsion order against the "national hero" Yrsch; in Germany the colors red, white and black symbolize the right while the colors red, black and gold symbolize the left. In one scene, a delegation of workers led by a huge union official respectfully pay a visit to Yrsch's estate to ask him to lead them on a struggle against the French, which was Kreutzer's way of showing that Germans needed to defer to their traditional elites to become great again. In paternal relationship, aristocrats like Yrsch understand the problems of the working class, and argue for fair treatment of the workers by their employers, which was Kreutzer's way of saying that in the Volksgemeinschaft the German people would all be united together as a one big happy family. The novel repeatedly hammers home the point that only if the German people are united as one in the form of the Volksgemeinschaft can Germany recover from the defeat of 1918, and throughout the novel Germans are of all classes are seen as victimized by the French and their "colored" troops. Wigger suggested that Kreutzer was using his racism as a way of uniting all Germans together as the working class characters find the question of racial purity more important than their wages, working conditions and standards of living, and at one point a union official says that every working-class family must be opposed to "mad strikes and Communist agitations" that weaken the unity of the German nation. In this regard, when the union leaders rebuke Lampré's father for his treasonous activities, he ceases to be an "exploitative" capitalist and turns into a "good German capitalist", having a very paternal relationship with his workers whom he takes care of and in their return defer to him.

At the end of the novel, Lampré marries Marlene and becomes a killing machine, saying no-one will ever threaten his "German sanctuary again", and his "soul is finally at peace" as he takes up the task of killing Senegalese and Moroccans with gusto. He and his bride enjoy a brief moment of happiness as they "raved and kissed" by the banks of the river Rhine and sing the song Lovers by the Rhine; subsequently an attempt to escape the Rhineland ends with Marlene being killed while Lampré who once rejected German nationalism sees it is too late for him and that his "treason" for having served France can never be fully redeemed. Collar wrote that in Kreutzer's novel, the "Black Horror" was "almost subsidiary in his eyes to a bigger issue-the simple fact that Germany had lost the war. The book was simply the expression of his resentment and fury ... The tenor of the book leaves little doubt that it reflected the views of the extreme right-wing völkisch circles, for whom defeat had come as a crushing blow and for whom the new Republic was an abomination. For them the Schwarze Schmach was clearly but one element in the array of grievances against France. Incitement of public hatred leading to a war of revenge in the indefinite future was much in evidence".

== French response ==
In response to stories about the "black horror on the Rhine", the French government published pamphlets to rebut the "calumnies" while several French newspapers in editorials accused the Germans of engaging in racism. In 1921, the French government published a pamphlet, La campagne contre les troupes noires, defending the Senegalese and pointing out inaccuracies in the articles by Morel and Beveridge's speeches, for instance, stating that 50,000 Senegalese had not been stationed in the Rhineland, with the total number of "colored" troops in the Rhineland numbering 25,000, of which 4,000 were Senegalese. The pamphlet also quoted from German newspapers such as Sozialistische Republik, Der Christliche Pilger and Deutsche pazifistische Monatsschrift, which all ran stories testifying to the good behavior of the "colored" troops. In Paris, the Comité d'Assistance aux Troupes Noires was founded to defend the reputation of the Senegalese. French Army doctors published statistics showing that there was not an abnormally high rate of syphilis among the Senegalese and the German claim that the Africans had brought sleeping sickness to the Rhineland could not be true as none of the Senegalese stationed in the Rhineland had sleeping sickness. The American historian Julia Roos wrote that the debate about the "Black Horror" stories cut across ideological lines; for instance, in France, it was chiefly left-wing groups that felt the Treaty of Versailles was too harsh on Germany who were the most receptive towards promoting "black horror" stories while it was conservatives believing in the justice of Versailles who defended the Senegalese against the "black horror" claims.

== Reception in the United States ==
However, the French efforts were in vain. On the night of 28 February 1921, a protest rally attended by 12,000 was held in Madison Square Garden in New York City where France was condemned for the "black horror on the Rhine". A Republican Representative, Frederick A. Britten, issued resolution condemning France for the "black horror on the Rhine", and which called the Senegalese "semi-civilized, useless and oft-times brutal defamers of women". The American feminist Harriet Connor Brown in a letter to the State Department written in early 1921 accused Senegalese soldiers of rape, attempted rape, "immoral crimes against boys" and of forcing German officials in the Rhineland to open brothels for their benefit. The Women's International League for Peace and Freedom issued a statement condemning the "black horror on the Rhine" that was signed by all 25 of its white members of its central committee, and the only one who refused to sign was the lone African-American on the central committee, Mary Terrell, who refused to sign a statement that was a "direct appeal to race prejudice".

The Francophile Republican Senator Henry Cabot Lodge had received leaked copies of the reports by Allen and Dresel, which he read out on the Senate floor "as act of justice and comity to a friendly nation [France]". Liberal American journals like The Nation and The New Republic ran several articles debunking the claims of "the black horror on the Rhine", showing that there were relatively few cases of rape by the Senegalese soldiers. The New York Times in an article on 25 June 1921 wrote about "a horrid lack of horrors on the Rhine". By 1921, many mayors in the Rhineland were complaining in letters to the Reich government in Berlin that the "black horror" propaganda had been too successful, charging that the picture of the Rhineland overrun by Senegalese soldiers looting, raping and killing with impunity, had destroyed the tourist trade. For this reason, the Rhenish mayors asked the Reich government stop the "black horror" propaganda which had ruined the tourism in the Rhineland.

== United Kingdom ==
E. D. Morel was one of the major promoters of the "Black Shame" in the United Kingdom.

== Story revives ==
When Raymond Poincaré, a French conservative well known for his views about upholding the Treaty of Versailles, became the French premier in 1922, there was a revival of the "black horror on the Rhineland" stories both in Germany and abroad. In Washington, Democratic Senator Gilbert Hitchcock in a speech on the Senate floor asked the administration of President Warren G. Harding "suggest to France the substitution of white troops for black on the Rhine". When the former French premier Georges Clemenceau visited the United States in November 1922, Senator Hitchcock confronted Clemenceau over the alleged "black outrages" in the Rhineland. In a speech, Senator Hitchcock declared about the Senegalese: "They are men of an inferior, half-civilized race. They are brutes when stationed among white people, as the evidence shows". Otto Wiefeldt, the German ambassador in Washington asked that his superiors supply him with "current information preferably with sensational details" as he noted that the stories about the "black horror on the Rhine" were winning over American public opinion to a pro-German position.

However, the French occupation of the Ruhr on 11 January 1923 caused the Auswärtige Amt to lose interest in the "black horror on the Rhine" story. Poincaré deliberately used only white troops in occupying the Ruhr to avoid more "black horror" stories, through the claim that a Senegalese regiment had been stationed in Essen was widely believed in both Germany and abroad. For most Germans, the French occupation of the Ruhr was a sufficiently "heinous crime against the peace" that there was no need to embellish it with "black horror" stories. At the same time, the last American occupation troops had been withdrawn from the Rhineland in January 1923, which meant that courting American public opinion was less important. In a speech given in Darmstadt on 13 February 1923, the Social Democratic German president Friedrich Ebert said: "daß die Verwendung farbiger Truppen niederster Kultur als Aufseher über eine Bevölkerung von der hohen geistigen und wirtschaftlichen Bedeutung der Rheinländer eine herausfordernde Verletzung der Gesetze europäischer Zivilisation ist" ("the use of troops of the lowest culture over the population of the highest spiritual and economic importance in the Rhineland is a challenging violation of the laws of European civilization").

== Continuing preoccupation ==
After 1921, the Reich government started to downplay the Black Horror propaganda, which had ruined tourism in the Rhineland, causing much resentment in a largely Catholic region that at very least wanted to break away from Protestant majority Prussia. Furthermore, many of those on the völkisch right made much of the fact there were consensual sexual relationships between mostly lower-class women in the Rhineland and "colored" French Army soldiers, attacking these women for bringing the so-called "Rhineland Bastards" into the world and threatening German racial purity. From the viewpoint of the Rhinelanders the obsession with relationships between German women and non-white French soldiers was highlighting an aspect of the French occupation that was not to their advantage, and many of the groups like the Rheinische Frauenliga that at first promoted the stories chose to downplay them as the 1920s went on. Finally the Reich government saw its own "Black Horror" propaganda boomerang. Since Germany had been more or less disarmed by the Treaty of Versailles, it was not possible for the Reich to go to war with France, and the völkisch groups opposed to the Weimar Republic used the "black horror" stories as a way of attacking the Weimar Republic as an "emasculated" state incapable of standing up to France; such attacks especially resonated with right-wing men. The end of the Ruhr crisis in September 1923 together with the Dawes Plan in 1924 led to an improvement in Franco-German relations, and Berlin had less interest in pursuing "black horror" stories. In January 1925, the French pulled out of the northern Rhineland and by this time there were hardly any "colored" troops by the Rhine. Despite this, the Canadian feminist Rose Henderson in a 1925 article in The British Columbia Federationist wrote "the power of France rests upon a black basis", which she called "one of the most menacing and sinister facts in history", going to condemn the French for training the Senegalese "to subdue and enslave white people".

However, the "black horror on the Rhine" did much to shape German views of both the French and Africans. In Mein Kampf, Adolf Hitler wrote: "7,000,000 people languish under alien rule and the main artery of the German people flows through the playground of black African hordes ... It was and is the Jews who bring the Negro to the Rhineland, always with the same concealed thought and with the clear goal of destroying by the bastardization of the white race they hate". In a 1928 speech, Hitler ranted against the "de-Germanization, Negrification and Judaization of our people". In his 1930 book The Myth of the 20th Century, Alfred Rosenberg denounced France for "contributing to the dehumanization of Europe by the means of blacks, just as had done by introducing Jewish emancipation 140 years ago". The "black horror on the Rhine" story featured prominently in Nazi anti-French propaganda and throughout the Third Reich with a recurring image in posters showing French Army soldiers as a stereotyped Africans molesting blonde Aryan women. The Nazi children's writer Minni Grosch wrote the novel Grenzlandjugend (1934) with the backdrop of the "Black Horror on the Rhine". On 29 May 1940, in part of the preparations for an offensive scheduled for 5 June, the Propaganda Minister Joseph Goebbels ordered a major media campaign to bring back memories of the "Black Horror on the Rhine" as a reason to hate France, saying at a conference that he wanted journalists to run stories that it had been "a cultural and racial disgrace ... to bring Negroes to the Rhineland" and to remind German people that the French once again had colored soldiers fighting for the republic. During the offensive in June 1940 along the river Somme and during the pursuit into central France, the Wehrmacht killed thousands of Senegalese taken prisoner to avenge the "black horror on the Rhine".

== See also ==
- Irish Fright – similar ethnoreligious panic in 17th century England
- Nadir of American race relations – Late 19th-/early 20th-century period of US history
- White backlash – Political theory
