= Association of German Housewives =

German Women's Association set up in 1873

The Association of German Housewives (German: Allgemeiner deutscher HausFrauenverein) was founded in Berlin in 1873 by Linda Morgenstern. Aside from acting as a lobbying group for housewives it published a magazine Deutscher Hausfrauenzeitung which Morgenstern edited. Alongside offering practical advice, the organisation ran a cooking school and labour exchange for domestic servants.

The organisation evolved by fighting for the rights of housewives and sought to gain recognition of housewifery as a profession. Following the outbreak of the First World War the association was involved in setting up the National Federation of German Housewives Associations () which played a role in food distribution and sharing information about food price control. Following the end of the First World War it was one of the most conservative groups within the League of German Women's Associations. It participated in the Rhenish Women's League, an organisation setup to protest against the use of African soldiers by the French Army in the occupation of the Rhineland.
