= Morocco in Diplomacy =

1912 book by Edmund Dene Morel

Morocco in Diplomacy was a book written by Edmund Dene Morel and first published by Smith, Elder & Co. in London, 1912. It received limited circulation although Morel believed it was read in influential circles.

However, following the outbreak of the First World War, it was republished as Ten Years of Secret Diplomacy: An Unheeded Warning by the National Labour Press in five large editions between March 1914 in July 1918.
