= E. D. Morel =

British politician (1873–1924)

- Morel, c. 1922

Member of Parliament for Dundee
- In office 1922–1924 Serving with Edwin Scrymgeour
- Preceded by: Winston Churchill; Alexander Wilkie
- Succeeded by: Tom Johnston; Edwin Scrymgeour

Personal details
- Born: Georges Edmond Pierre Achille Morel Deville; 10 July 1873 Paris, France
- Died: 12 November 1924 (aged 51) North Bovey, Moreton Hampstead, Devon, England
- Party: Labour
- Spouse: Mary Richardson (m. 1896)
- Children: 5
- Occupation: Journalist, author, politician

Edmund Dene Morel (born Georges Edmond Pierre Achille Morel Deville; 10 July 1873 – 12 November 1924) was a French-born British journalist, author, pacifist and politician.

As a young official at the shipping company Elder Dempster, Morel observed a fortune being made in the import of Congo rubber and the shipping out of guns and manacles. He correctly deduced that the rubber and other resources were being extracted from the Congolese by force and began to campaign to expose the abuses. In collaboration with Roger Casement, Morel led a campaign against slavery in the Congo Free State, founded the Congo Reform Association and published the West African Mail. With the help of celebrities such as Arthur Conan Doyle and Mark Twain, the movement successfully pressured the Belgian King Leopold II to sell the Congo Free State to the Belgian government, ending some of the human rights abuses perpetrated under his rule.

Morel played a significant role in the British pacifist movement during the First World War, participating in the foundation of and becoming secretary of the Union of Democratic Control, at which point he broke with the Liberal Party. In 1917 he was jailed for six months for his antiwar activism, which had a permanent effect on his health. After the war, he edited the journal Foreign Affairs, through which he sharply criticised what he considered French aggression and mistreatment of the defeated Central Powers. As part of his campaign against the French, he became the most important English proponent of the Black Shame campaign, which accused black French troops of outrages against the population of the occupied Rhineland.

Morel was elected to Parliament in 1922 as a Labour candidate, defeating the incumbent Winston Churchill for his seat, and was re-elected in 1924, dying in office. Morel collaborated closely with future Prime Minister Ramsay MacDonald and was considered for the post of Foreign Secretary, though he ultimately acted only as an unofficial adviser to MacDonald's government.

== Background ==
Morel was born in the Avenue d'Eylau, Paris. His father, Edmond Pierre Marie Morel de Ville, was a French civil servant; his mother, Eliza Emmeline de Horne, was from an English Quaker family and landed gentry - the De Hornes of Stanway Hall. Edmond died when his son was four years old, leaving no pension, and Emmeline subsequently fell out with her late husband's family. As a consequence, Emmeline changed her name to Deville and raised her son on her own. To remove her son from the family's influence, she worked as a teacher so that she could send him to boarding school at both Madras House school in Eastbourne and later at Bedford Modern School.

When Emmeline Deville fell ill in 1888, the money for school fees was no longer available and Edmund was forced to return to Paris to work as a bank clerk. He was able to move his mother back to England in 1891. Five years later, he successfully applied for naturalisation as a British subject and anglicised his name. He married Mary Richardson that same year; they had five children. His daughter Stella married the Polish political activist Joseph Retinger in 1926. They had two daughters.

== Congo activism ==
=== Discoveries at Elder Dempster ===
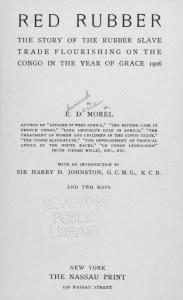
Red Rubber: "The Story of the Rubber Slave Trade Flourishing on the Congo in the Year of Grace, 1906"

In 1891, Morel obtained a clerkship with Elder Dempster, a Liverpool shipping firm. To increase his income and support his family, from 1893 Morel began writing articles against French protectionism, which was damaging Elder Dempster's business. He came to be critical of the Foreign Office for not supporting the rights of Africans under colonial rule. His vision of Africa was influenced by the books of Mary Kingsley, an English traveller and writer, which showed sympathy for African peoples and a respect for different cultures that was very rare amongst Europeans at the time. Groups such as the Aborigines' Protection Society had already begun a campaign against alleged atrocities in Congo.

Elder Dempster had a shipping contract with the Congo Free State for the connection between Antwerp and Boma. Due to his knowledge of French, Morel was often sent to Belgium, where he was able to view the internal accounts of the Congo Free State held by Elder Dempster. The knowledge that the Elder Dempster ships leaving Belgium for the Congo regularly carried guns, chains, ordnance and explosives, and articles which were remote from trade purposes, while ships arriving from the colony came back full of valuable products such as raw rubber and ivory, led him to the conclusion that Belgian King Leopold II's policy was exploitative and a type of slavery. According to author Adam Hochschild, Morel's conclusions were correct—the value of the goods coming from the Congo Free State was five times that of the goods coming from Europe, and the difference was being extracted from the Congolese population through force and mass atrocities.

Morel discussed the discrepancies with the head of the Elder Dempster line, who responded coldly and dismissively. The company soon offered Morel an overseas promotion and then a sinecure consultancy in return for a guarantee of his silence. Morel refused both offers, and left the company in 1901 to become a full-time journalist.

=== Journalism and Congo Reform Association ===
In 1900, Morel put new life into the campaign against Congo misrule (begun a decade before by the American George Washington Williams) with a series of articles detailing his discoveries about the Congo Free State trade imbalances. His inside information made him a powerful voice against the exploitation, as previous activists had lacked his access to precise figures about the trade. In 1903, he founded his own magazine, the West African Mail, with the collaboration of John Holt, a businessman and friend of Mary Kingsley, who feared that the system of the Congo Free State would be applied upon the rest of the West African colonies. The Mail was an "illustrated weekly journal founded to meet the rapidly growing interest in west and central African questions". The paper also received initial financial backing from Sir Alfred Lewis Jones, Morel's former employer at Elder Dempster, apparently in a final attempt to moderate Morel's criticism of the company, but Jones soon discontinued his support. Morel published several pamphlets and his first book, Affairs of West Africa, a collection of his essays.

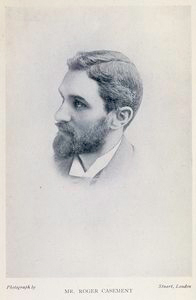
Roger Casement's 1904 report confirmed Morel's accusations.

In 1903, under pressure from Morel's campaign, the British House of Commons passed a resolution protesting human rights abuses in the Congo. Subsequently, the British consul in the Congo, Roger Casement, was sent up country by the Foreign Office for an investigation. Casement was outraged by the evidence of atrocities that he discovered and wrote a blistering report in 1904, discussing its contents with the London press even before its official release. Morel was introduced to Casement by their mutual friend Herbert Ward just before the publication of the report and realised that in Casement he had found the ally he had sought. Casement convinced Morel to establish an organisation for dealing specifically with the Congo question, the Congo Reform Association; because of the restrictions placed on Casement by his official duties, Morel would be the organisation's head. Affiliates of the Congo Reform Association were established as far away as the United States.

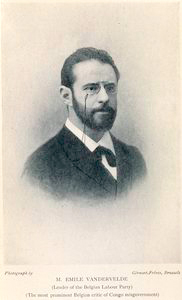
The Belgian socialist leader Emile Vandervelde aided Morel by sending him copies of parliamentary debates.

The Congo Reform Association had the support of famous writers such as Joseph Conrad (whose Heart of Darkness was inspired by a voyage to the Congo Free State), Anatole France, Nobel laureates Bjørnstjerne Bjørnson and John Galsworthy, Sherlock Holmes creator Arthur Conan Doyle, civil rights activist Booker T. Washington, and Mark Twain. Conan Doyle wrote The Crime of the Congo in 1908, while Twain gave the most famous contribution with the satirical short story King Leopold's Soliloquy. Conrad and Ford Madox Ford also included a devastating parody of Leopold II in their cowritten novel The Inheritors.

Morel's best allies, however, may have been the Christian missionaries who furnished him with eyewitness accounts and photographs of the atrocities, such as those given by the Americans William Morrison and William Henry Sheppard, and the British John Hobbis Harris and Alice Harris. The chocolate millionaire William Cadbury, a Quaker, was one of his main financial backers. The Belgian socialist leader Emile Vandervelde sent him copies of Belgian parliamentary debates and was recruited by Morel to successfully defend the missionaries Sheppard and Morrison pro bono in a libel suit brought by Kasai Rubber Company. Morel also had secret connections with some agents within the Congo Free State itself. Even the Church of England and American religious groups backed him.

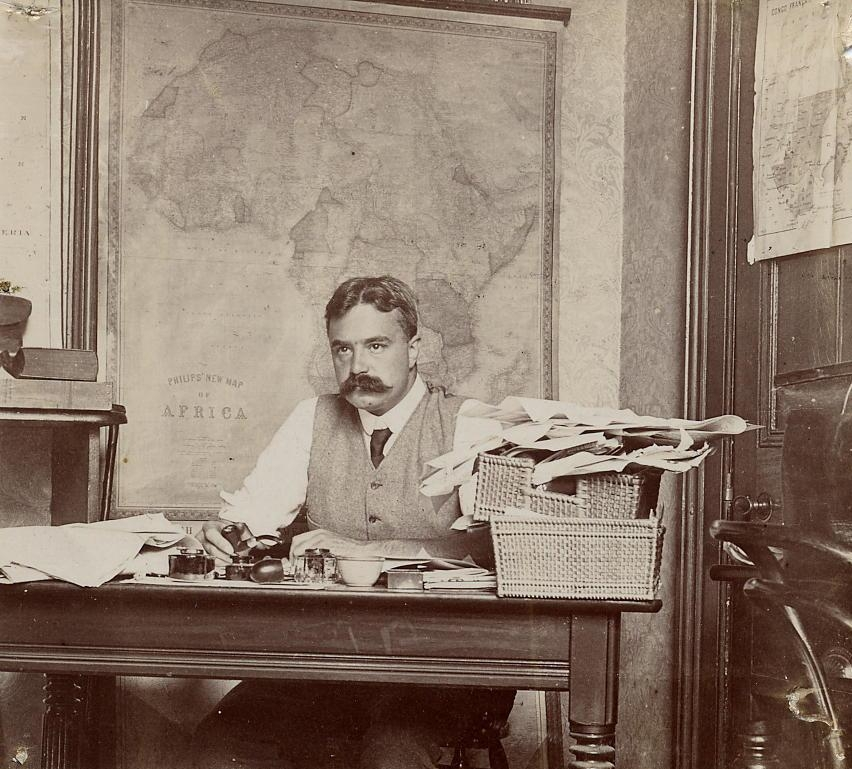
Morel in 1905

In 1905 the movement won a victory when a Commission of Enquiry, instituted (under external pressure) by King Léopold II himself, substantially confirmed the accusations made about the colonial administration. In the face of mounting public and diplomatic pressure, in 1908 the Congo was annexed to the Belgian government and put under its sovereignty. Despite this, Morel refused to declare an end to the campaign until 1913 because he wanted to see actual changes in the situation of the country. The Congo Reform Association ended operations in 1913.

== World War I activism ==
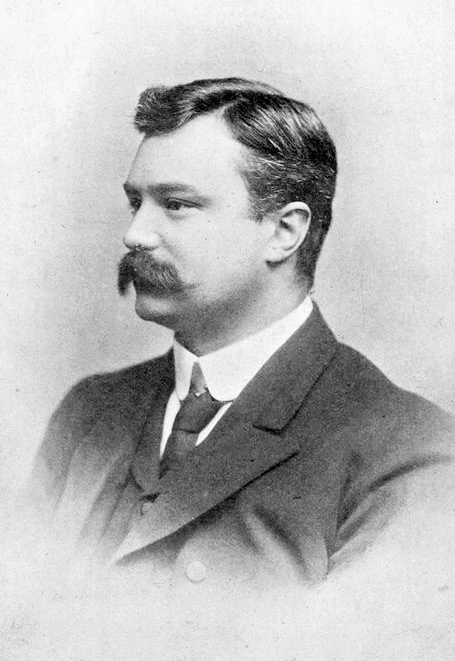
E. D. Morel before WWI

=== Foreign policy ===
During the Agadir Crisis of 1911, Morel was entirely in sympathy with Germany and opposed to what he regarded as bellicosity by the United Kingdom and France, as well as secret diplomacy between the states involved. He wrote Morocco in Diplomacy (1912) to express his views on the issue. At this time he was also selected by the Liberal Party as a prospective House of Commons candidate for Birkenhead.

=== Pacifism and formation of Union of Democratic Control ===
As the tension grew in the run-up to World War I, Morel was again sympathetic to Germany, disinclined to stand by Belgium under German pressure, and opposed to the United Kingdom and France getting involved in war. He campaigned for neutrality but on the outbreak of war accepted that the fight was lost, and with Charles Trevelyan, Norman Angell and Ramsay MacDonald, formed the Union of Democratic Control to press for a more responsive foreign policy (he also resigned his candidature at this time). He was Secretary of the UDC until his death. The main demands of the UDC were: (1) that in future to prevent secret diplomacy there should be parliamentary control over foreign policy; (2) there should be negotiations after the war with other democratic European countries in an attempt to form an organisation to help prevent future conflicts; (3) that at the end of the war the terms of peace should neither humiliate the defeated nation nor artificially rearrange frontiers, as this might provide a cause for future wars.

The Union of Democratic Control became the most important of all the anti-war organisations in Britain, with membership reaching 650,000 by 1917. His political courage was praised by people such as Bertrand Russell and the writer Romain Rolland, but his leading role in the pacifist movement exposed him to violent attacks led by the pro-war press. He was pictured as an agent of Germany in the Daily Express, a newspaper that also listed details of future UDC meetings and encouraged its readers to attend and break them up. The accusation gained some credibility when Roger Casement, who was known as a friend and supporter of Morel, was hanged for treason (he had contacted the Germans seeking support for Irish nationalism). Morel was even the victim of occasional physical assaults.

=== Imprisonment ===
On 22 August 1917 Morel's house was searched and evidence was discovered that he had sent a UDC pamphlet to Romain Rolland in Switzerland, a neutral country, which was a breach of the Defence of the Realm Act. Morel was sentenced to six months' imprisonment, which he served in Pentonville Prison. Although along with other pacifists, he was placed in the 'second division', allowing some privileges over the majority of prisoners, conditions were very hard, and Morel's health was seriously damaged. Russell described his condition at his release:

His hair is completely white (there was hardly a tinge of white before) when he first came out, he collapsed completely, physically and mentally, largely as the result of insufficient food. He says one only gets three quarters of an hour reading in the whole day – the rest of the time is spent on prison work, etc.

Morel was released in January 1918.

=== Independent Labour Party membership ===
In April 1918, he joined the Independent Labour Party, and began to feed his views into the Labour Party to which it was affiliated and which adopted his critical view of the Treaty of Versailles. Morel explained his decision to join the Independent Labour Party to a friend:

I have long been gravitating towards the Socialist position—of course there is Socialism and Socialism, and mine is of the reasonable and moderate kind. When I look over my public efforts through the years, it seems to me that I have been a Socialist all my life. So far as any Party can express what appears to me to be the country's needs, the ILP approximates nearer to my outlook that any other, although I still look forward to and hope for the day when all really progressive forces can unite under the title of the Democratic Party. But Liberalism as represented by both wings—the Lloyd George wing, and the Asquith wing, is right outside my outlook now.

== Post-war activism ==
=== Treaty of Versailles ===
Morel was severely critical of the Treaty of Versailles and warned that it would lead to another war. He particularly opposed the assignment of "war guilt" exclusively to the Central Powers as well as the mandate system for former German colonies. The latter theme became the focus of his 1920 book The Black Man's Burden.

He did not give up his career as a journalist, becoming director of the UDC's journal, originally titled The UDC, later Foreign Affairs: A Journal of International Understanding. Foreign Affairs became a significant voice of the English left about foreign politics at the time and represented the views of the UDC. In his articles for the magazine, Morel blamed France and Tsarist Russia, not the Central Powers, for the origins of the war and was scathingly critical of French imperialism. Morel's articles also deplored the fate of the new nation of Hungary, which had been part of the Dual Monarchy of Austria-Hungary before the war. The former Kingdom of Hungary was stripped of more than two thirds of its territory and most of its population in the 1920 Treaty of Trianon. Morel portrayed Hungary as a victim of French rapacity that reduced it to "Hopeless, Heart-Breaking Bondage".

=== The Black Horror on the Rhine ===
As part of his general opposition to French foreign policy, Morel played a key role in launching the British-based part of the Black Shame campaign, a campaign against the use of 'primitive' black troops by the French Army during its occupation of the Rhineland. In a front-page article in The Daily Herald on 9 April 1920 by Morel about the French occupation of the Rhineland, the headline read, ": "Frankfurt runs red with blood French Black Troops Use Machine-guns on Civilians". The following day, the same paper had another cover story by Morel, the title of which was "Black Scourge In Europe Sexual Horror Let Loose by France On Rhine Disappearance of Young German Girls". In it, Morel wrote that France is "thrusting her black savages into the heart of Germany" and that the "primitive African savages, the carriers of syphilis, have become a horror and a terror" to the Rhinelanders. In his article, Morel claimed that the Senegalese soldiers serving in the French Army were "primitive African barbarians" who "stuffed their haversacks with eye-balls, ears and heads of the foe". Morel declared in his article:

There [the Rhineland] they [the Senegalese soldiers] have become a terror and a horror unimaginable to the countryside, raping girls and women – for well known physiological reasons, the raping of a white woman by a negro is nearly always accompanied by serious injuries and not infrequently has fatal results; spreading syphilis, murdering inoffensive civilians, often getting completely out of control; the terrible barbaric incarnation of a barbarous policy, embodied in a so-called peace treaty which puts the clock back 2,000 years".

Morel wrote that "black savages" have uncontrolled sexual impulses that "must be satisfied upon the bodies of white women!" (emphasis in the original).

The phrase that Morel coined to describe the alleged terror by Senegalese troops in the Rhineland was the "Black Horror on the Rhine", which became internationally famous, and the campaign against the "black horror" took much of his time for the last four years of his life. Morel predicated the "black horror" would cause another world war, writing that the average German boy was thinking: "Boys these men raped your mothers and sisters" (emphasis in the original). Morel used the "black horror" as a way of attacking France, which he claimed had caused a "sexual horror on the Rhine" and whose "reign of terror" was a "giant evil" that should inspire "shame into all four corners of the world" and ultimately should "a revision of the Versailles Treaty and the relief for Germany".

The German sociologist Iris Wigger wrote that Morel's "Black Horror on the Rhine" campaign has caused much embarrassment to Morel's admirers today, who would rather remember the man who campaigned against the Congo Free State, but in fact, both campaigns were manifestations of the same racism since he believed that all black people were innately stupid and inferior to white people in all respects. Though Morel had been very forceful in condemning the cruel exploitation of the Congo Free State, he believed in a liberal imperialism, just not the cruel exploitative imperialism of the Congo Company. He wrote that it was the duty of whites to serve as the "trustees" for blacks and the "great white father" who would protect the "basic human rights" of Africans while at the same time accepting the "infantile" nature of black people, who not the equal in any way of whites. Morel himself did not see his campaign as racist and always presented himself as a friend to black people. In France, the French socialist Charles Gide wrote about Morel's claims to be a protector of Africans: le genre de protection de M. Morel rappelle un peu le precepte que fait afficher la Society protectrice des animaux: 'Soyez bons pour les betes' (Mr. Morel's kind of protection recalls a little the precepts of the Society for the Protection of Animals: 'Be good to animals').

In particular, Morel believed that Africans, lacking the self-discipline of whites, had an uncontrolled sexuality and often wrote about that subject. Morel believed that because of the high infant mortality in the tropics Africans had evolved in such a way as to be obsessed with sex, to the exclusion of everything else, as they needed a high birth rate to maintain their numbers. Precisely because Morel believed in the uncontrolled sexuality of blacks, he considered it self-evident that the "sexually uncontrolled and uncontrollable" Senegalese would run amok in the Rhineland and rape every German female in sight. Two contemporaries challenged Morel on that: Claude McKay, the Jamaican poet and labour activist, and Norman Leys, the British Africanist. Leys stated that such allegations constituted "one of the great sources of race hatred" and "should never be repeated by any honest man or honest newspaper".

Morel was very anti-French because of his opposition to the Treaty of Versailles but also the nature of France's mission civilisatrice ("civilizing mission") in Africa, with any African willing to embrace the French language and culture becoming French and theoretically the equal of whites, threatened to upend Morel's beliefs in the essential biological inferiority of blacks. Morel believed that the Africans were committing outrageous crimes against Germans in the Rhineland because the French had empowered them, at least theoretically, by making them into black Frenchmen, who were just as much French citizens as anyone else.

== Parliament ==
In the 1922 general election, which followed the retirement of an incumbent Labour Member of Parliament, Alexander Wilkie, Morel fought the two-member Dundee constituency as a sole Labour candidate. Although he gained fewer votes than Edwin Scrymgeour of the Scottish Prohibition Party, he won the second seat, in the process defeating one of the outgoing members, Winston Churchill, standing as a National Liberal. Morel regarded Churchill as a warmonger and took pride in having defeated him: "I look upon Churchill as such a personal force for evil that I would take up the fight against him with a whole heart".

With his foreign affairs specialty, he was expected to be appointed as Foreign Secretary in the government of Ramsay MacDonald in 1924, but MacDonald decided to serve as his own Foreign Secretary. Possibly in compensation, MacDonald led an attempt to nominate Morel for the Nobel Peace Prize. In August 1924, Morel is believed to have persuaded MacDonald to recognise the communist government in the Soviet Union and nominations on the Anglo-Soviet trade treaty.

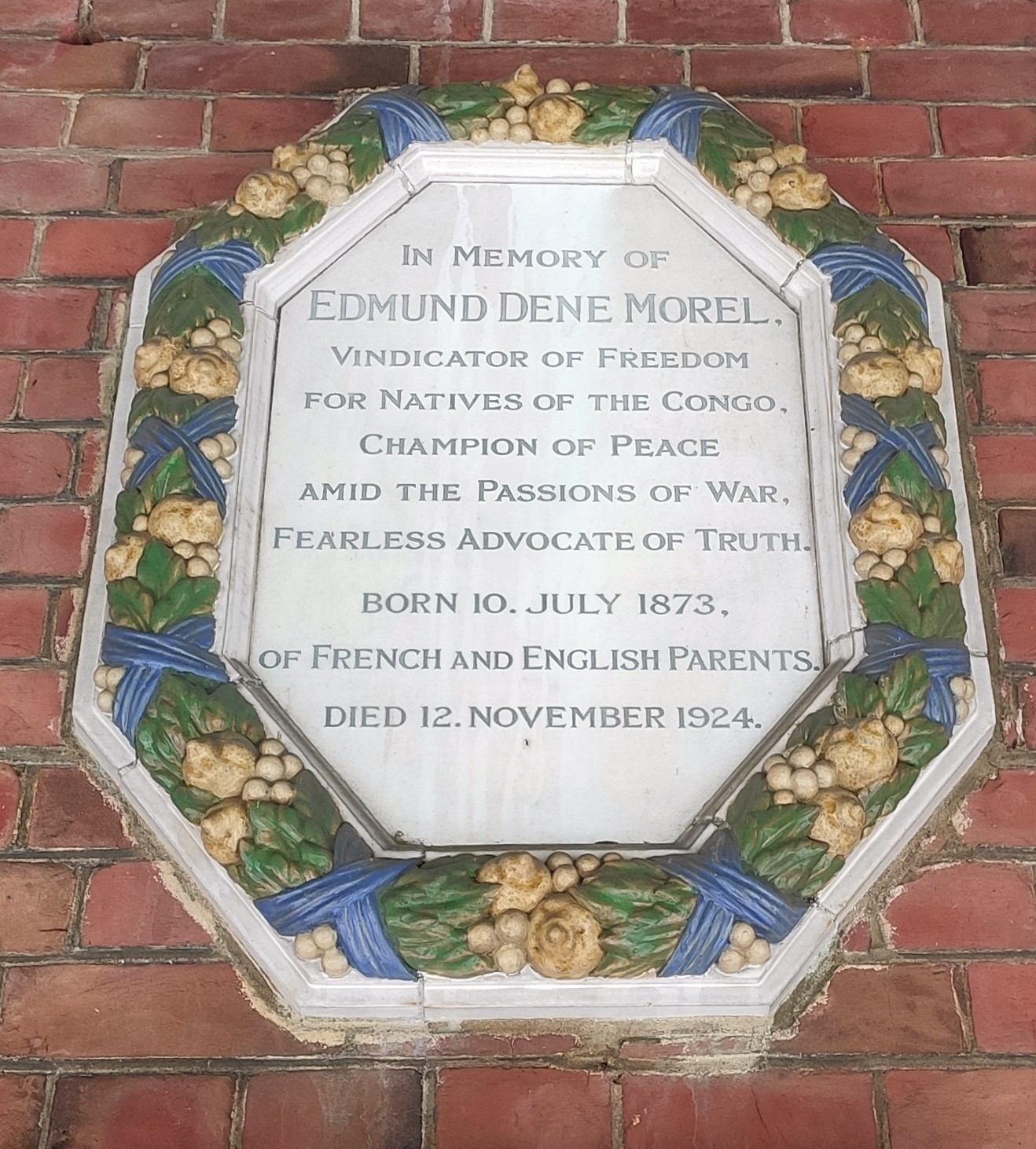
Plaque dedicated to Morel at Golders Green Crematorium

Shortly after his re-election in the 1924 general election, Morel suffered a fatal heart attack while walking in south Devon. He was cremated at Golders Green Crematorium.

== Legacy ==
Arthur Conan Doyle became acquainted with Morel through the work of the Congo Reform Association. In his novel The Lost World (1912), he used Morel as an inspiration for the character of Ed Malone. Philosopher and activist Bertrand Russell said of Morel, "No other man known to me has had the same heroic simplicity in pursuing and proclaiming political truth." George Orwell, writing in 1946, described Morel as "heroic but rather forgotten man." Author Jasper Morel Fforde states that Morel is his great-grandfather.

In assessing Morel's impact on the Congo, contemporary author Adam Hochschild—whose bestseller King Leopold's Ghost had revived Morel's reputation—wrote:

Did the Congo Reform campaign save millions of lives? For many years, the conventional answer was yes ... but the truth is more somber. Some of the worst abuses in the Congo, such as the kidnapping of hostages, did stop as a result of the publicity. But the near-genocidal death rate in the territory continued for more than a decade under Belgian rule.

After making this statement, Hochschild concludes, Morel's movement served two great purposes:

First, they put a remarkable amount of information on the historical record ... The movement's other great achievement is that, among its supporters, it kept alive a tradition, a way of seeing the world, a human capacity for being outraged because pain is being inflicted on another human being, even when that pain is inflicted on someone of another color, in another country ... It is this spirit that underlies organisations like Amnesty International ... and Médecins Sans Frontières.

== Bibliography ==
- Affairs of West Africa (1902)
- The British Case in French Congo (1903)
- King Leopold's Rule in Africa (1904)
- Red Rubber – The story of the rubber slave trade that flourished in Congo in the year of grace 1906 (1906)
- Great Britain and the Congo: the Pillage of the Congo Basin (1909) - Introduction by A. Conan Doyle
- Nigeria: Its Peoples And Its Problems (1911)
- Morocco in Diplomacy (1912) (reissued as Ten Years of Secret Diplomacy in 1915)
- Truth and the War (1916)
- The African problem and the peace settlement (1917)
- The Black Man's Burden (1920)
- Thoughts on the War
- The Peace, and Prison
- Pre-War Diplomacy
- Diplomacy Revealed (1921)
- The Horror on the Rhine (1921) (pamphlet)
- Military preparations for the Great War : fact versus fiction (1922)
- The Secret History of a Great Betrayal (1924)

== See also ==
- List of peace activists
- Jules Marchal, Belgian diplomat and author on colonial exploitation.

== Notes ==
Parliament of the United Kingdom
Preceded by Winston Churchill and Alexander Wilkie	Member of Parliament for Dundee; 1922–1924; With: Edwin Scrymgeour	Succeeded by Thomas Johnston and Edwin Scrymgeour
