= Norman Leys =

British Africanist and political critic (1875–1944)

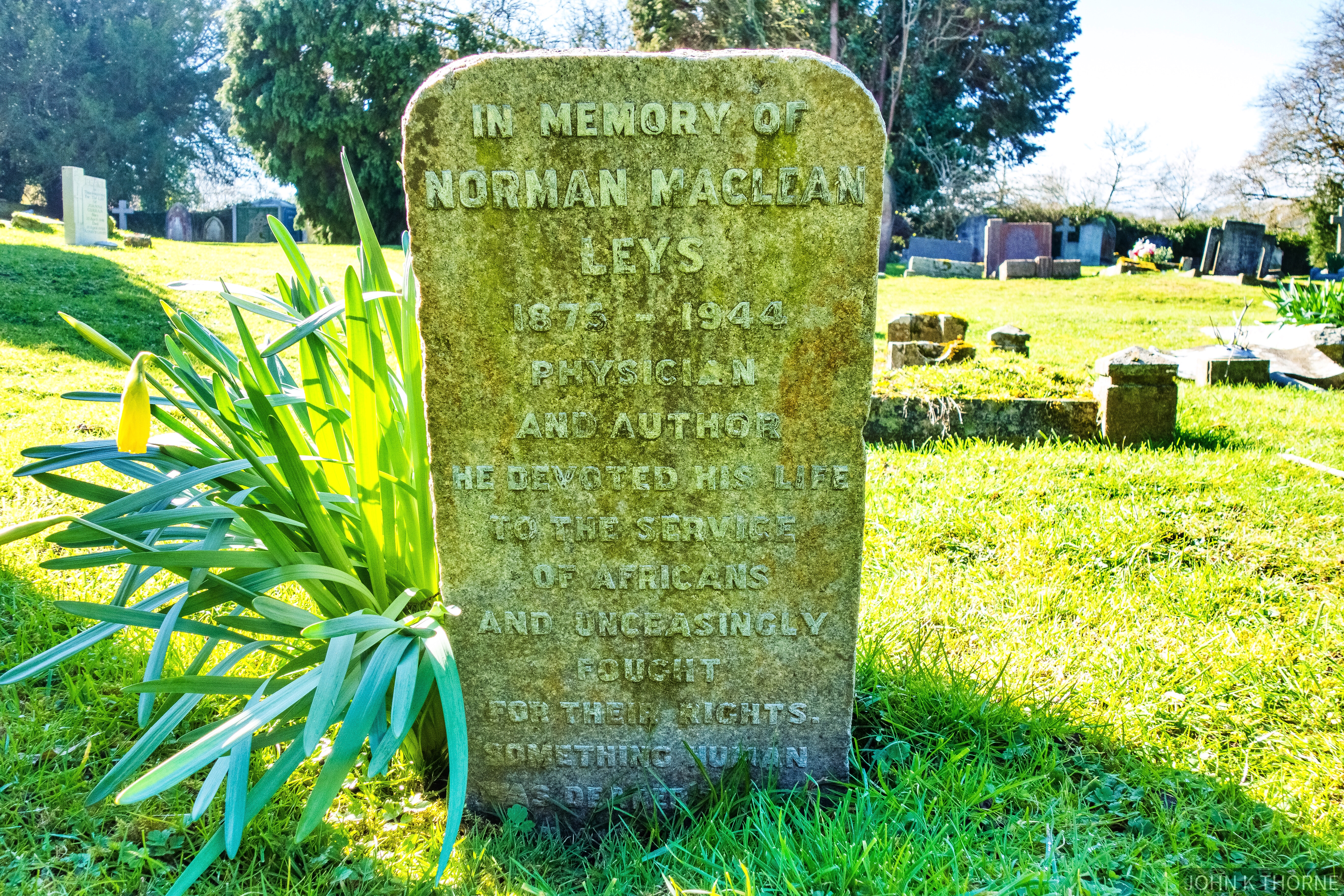
- Headstone of Leys
- Born: Norman Maclean Leys; 1875; Scotland
- Died: 15 August 1944 (aged 68–69); Yalding, England
- Education: University of Glasgow
- Occupations: Africanist, political critic

Norman Maclean Leys (1875 – 15 August 1944) was a British Africanist and political critic. He was described by his Manchester Guardian obituarist as "a fiery and determined prophet on colonial affairs, especially as he saw them in East Africa".

== Life ==
Leys was born in Scotland in 1875. He studied medicine at the University of Glasgow, where he specialized in obstetrics. He became a medical officer in Kenya in 1904, and remained in the colonial service in Africa for their next sixteen years. Leys, whose Christian Socialism informed his belief in racial equality, became an outspoken critic of the way in which the arrival of white planters had impacted Africans.

In 1920, he responded to the Black Horror on the Rhine campaign orchestrated by E. D. Morel against the French use of African Troops in the occupation of the Rhineland. Whereas Morel had claimed that African troops were particularly prone to rape, Leys denied this—based on 17 years experience in tropical Africa—and further stated that such allegations constituted "one of the great sources of race hatred" and "should never be repeated by any honest man or honest newspaper".

Kenya (1924), with an introduction by Gilbert Murray, was reprinted in 1925 and 1926. Disappointed by the East African policies of the first and second Labour governments, Leys resigned from the Advisory Committee to the Labour Party in April 1931. In 1938, with Leonard Barnes and Julius Lewin, he founded a socialist journal, Empire, subsequently taken over by the Fabian Colonial Bureau. In February 1939 Leys drafted a memorandum for the Labour Party arguing against the colour bar: the memo was incorporated into a draft by Leonard Woolf which became an official Labour Party document in 1943.

Leys died in Yalding on 15 August 1944. His correspondence with J. H. Oldham was published in 1976.

== Works ==
- A plan for government by mandate in Africa, 1921
- Kenya, 1924. With an introduction by Gilbert Murray.
- Why the landworker is poor, 1925
- A last chance in Kenya, 1931
- The Colour Bar in East Africa, London: Hogarth Press, 1941
