= Minni Grosch =

German writer

Minni Grosch (born Wilhelmine Maria Grosch, 13 September 1879 – 21 January 1963), also known as Minnie Grosch and Elisabeth Gerheim, was a German writer. She published mainly girls’ literature (Mädchenliteratur) between the 1920s and the 1950s. Some of her works from the 1930s contain antisemitic and racist themes aligned with Nazi propaganda.

== Life ==
Grosch was born in 1879 in Mainz-Kastel. Her sister was the painter Sophie Grosch (1874–1962). She attended the teacher training college in Darmstadt and later worked as an in-house editor at the Union Deutsche Verlagsgesellschaft publishing house in Stuttgart from 1912 to 1934. Between 1912 and 1928 she also ran a private school.

During the 1920s and 1930s, Grosch published several Backfischromane (novels for adolescent girls) as part of the Kränzchen Library series, many of which were reprinted several times. Under the Nazi regime, she wrote several propagandistic novels for girls. After the Second World War, her 1938 novel Um Hof und Sippe was placed on the list of banned literature (Liste der auszusondernden Literatur) in the Soviet occupation zone.

Grosch died in 1963 in Mainz-Gonsenheim. In 2020, she was included in a list of women from Gonsenheim who were proposed as potential namesakes for streets in Mainz.

== Themes ==
Scholarly research on Grosch’s work has primarily focused on those novels that reflected National Socialist ideology, especially Grenzlandjugend and Ein Mädel kämpft fürs neue Reich (both 1934).

The cover of Ein Mädel kämpft fürs neue Reich, designed by Kurt Lange, depicts a member of the Bund Deutscher Mädel (League of German Girls) standing beside a German Shepherd and raising her hand in the Hitler salute.

Grenzlandjugend draws on the racist campaign of the so-called “Black Horror on the Rhine”, which portrayed Black soldiers in the French occupation army in the Rhineland after World War I as a threat to German womanhood and thus to Germanness itself. In this propaganda narrative, Black people were dehumanized and depicted as violent and sexually predatory. Such depictions continued in literature even after the withdrawal of nonwhite troops in the late 1920s.

According to literary scholar Joseph Kebe-Nguema, Grosch incorporated elements of colonial girls’ literature (Mädchenkolonialliteratur) into the novel. The female protagonist breaks from traditional gender roles by entering male-coded spheres of resistance against French occupation and by demonstrating nationalist courage in service to Germany. Nonwhite characters—specifically, Black French soldiers—are depicted in racist and dehumanizing terms as animals and as the primary threat to white women.

Grosch also portrays sexual relationships between Germans and non-Germans in Grenzlandjugend negatively, as did other writers of popular fiction on the “Black Horror” theme, such as Marga Trott (Freiwild am Rhein, 1922) and Artur Landsberger (Elisabeth, 1922). White French soldiers are depicted as cruel; in one episode, a white French soldier exploits a German woman who is not nationalist-minded and becomes involved with him. Kebe-Nguema writes: “Those who associate with non-Germans ultimately suffer for it.”

In Grenzlandjugend, Grosch expresses antisemitic ideas by blaming Jews for Germany’s postwar decline: “They were mostly immigrants from the East, indifferent to Germany’s fate. Like vampires, they pitilessly sucked the people’s last strength.” Grosch contrasts the alleged greed of Jewish characters with the generosity of her German protagonists.

== Works ==
- Die Letzte des Hauses Willbrunn (1921) – novel, part of the Kränzchen Library
- Jungbrunnen (1923) – novel, part of the Kränzchen Library
- Die Kloppensteiner (1928) – novel, part of the Kränzchen Library
- Der Freundschaft duftig Blümlein. Erzählungen für junge Mädchen (1928)
- Das Nichtslein (1928) – short story, part of the Kränzchen Library
- Vor goldenen Toren. Eine fröhliche Jungmädchengeschichte (1929) – part of the Kränzchen Library
- Der wunderbare Jakob. Heiteres und Ernstes aus der Schulmädchenzeit (1929)
- Durch Freud und Leid. Schicksale zweier Mädchen (1929)
- Kunterbunt. Lustige Kindergeschichten (1931) – illustrated by Johannes Grüger
- Fräulein Lohengrin. Lustige Jungmädelgeschichten (1931)
- Lustiges aus der Quarta (1932) – short story
- Drei Mädchen auf der Waage. Erzählung für junge Mädchen (1932) – part of the Kränzchen Library
- Der Weg ins Freie. Heitere Jungmädelgeschichte (1933)
- Das alte Lied. Fröhlich-Beschauliches um ein Original der Rokokozeit (1933)
- Grenzlandjugend. Erzählung aus deutscher Notzeit (1934)
- Ein Mädel kämpft fürs neue Reich. Erzählung aus deutscher Sturmzeit (1934)
- Verlockende Pfade. Eine tragikomische Jungmädelgeschichte (1934) – part of the Kränzchen Library
- Die Draufgängerin. Eine Geschichte mit vertauschten Rollen (1935)
- Marlens stiller Liebesweg (1937)
- Um Hof und Sippe (1938)
- Menschen im Strom (1939)
- Die große Kraft der kleinen Anne-Barb. Roman für junge Mädchen (1940)
- Die Frau für Detlev Torsten (1940)
- Das Kreuz am Wege. Eine Begegnung heute (1951)
- Wenn Tiere lachen könnten ... Heiter-Besinnliches von uns und ihnen (1951)
- Betty geht in Urlaub (1956)
