= Rheinische Volkspflege =

German propaganda organisation

The Rheinische Volkspflege (RVP) was a propaganda organisation founded on 1 August 1919 as part of the Reichszentrale für Heimatsdienst (Reich Central Office for Home Service), the official press department of the Weimar Republic. It provided an umbrella organisation for a variety of educational and nationalistic movements during the occupation of the Rhineland by allied forces as accepted by the Treaty of Versailles. The name can be translated as "Protectors of the Rhenish people".

The organisation was first established under the leadership of Alfred von Wrochem, until differences of opinion between him and his superiors led to his replacement in June 1921. Von Wrochem subsequently published Die Kolonisation der Rheinlande durch Frankreich (The Colonisation of the Rhineland by France) to present his views in 1922. However his use of official documents led to further disapproval from the Heimatsdienst.

The RVP had a political department which co-ordinated the production of anti-French propaganda including material about the so-called Black Shame – the use of African troops by the French Army during the occupation of the Rhineland. There was also a press department, the Pressestelle and the Rheinische Frauenliga (Rhenish Women's league) which was headed by Margarete Gärtner from offices in Berlin.
