= Harriet A. Brown =

American inventor

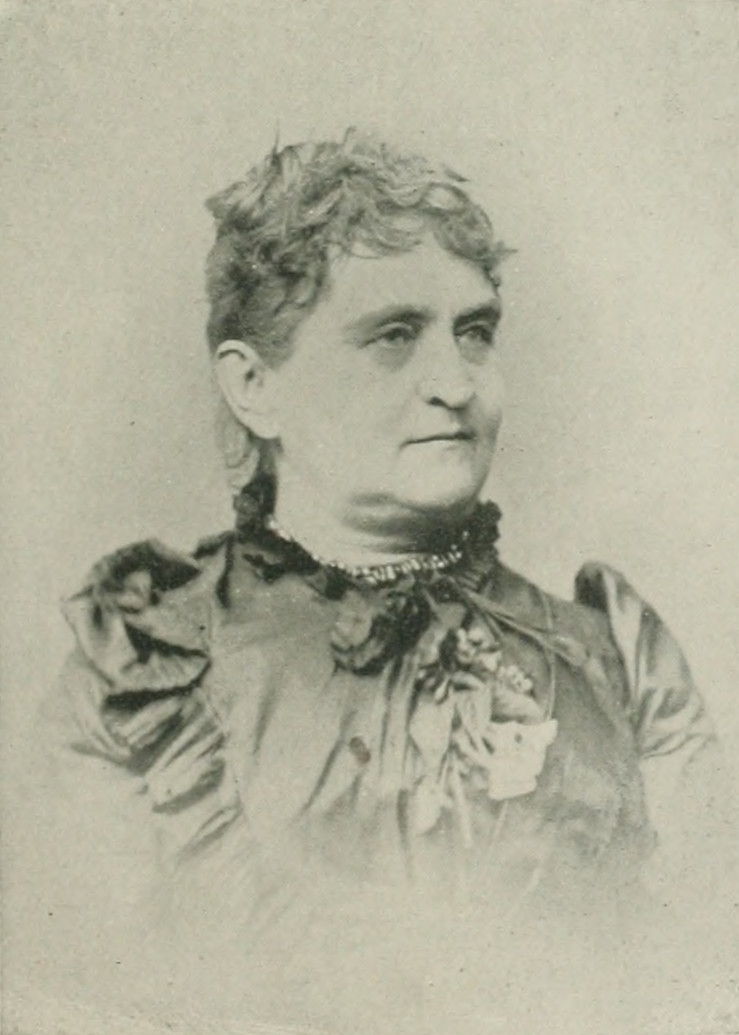
Harriet A. Brown

Harriet A. Brown (February 20, 1847 - 1930) was an inventor who patented "The Harriet A. Brown system," a dress cutting and making system.

== Early life ==
Harriet A. Brown was born in Augusta, Maine, on February 20, 1847. She was of Scotch parentage.

== Career ==
By contact with working girls Harriet A. Brown learned of the long hours, hard work and small wages of which most of them complained, and her ardent desire was to alleviate their distress. Brown conceived the idea of establishing a regular school of training for women who desired to make themselves self-supporting, and, on the solicitation of many prominent and philanthropic women of Boston, she opened the Dress-Cutting College in that city on October 17, 1886. In opening her college, she had the cooperation of those who induced her to establish such a school in Boston, but the underlying ideas, the scientific rules for dress-cutting, the patented system used, and all the methods of instruction, were her own.

The chief aim of the institution was to be one in which girls of ability and taste, who were engaged in stores, workshops and kitchens, could find employment for which they were better adapted. Brown's system of cutting was the result of years of study. All its points she had thoroughly mastered, and had succeeded in patenting rules for cutting, and also obtained the only patent for putting work together.

She received numerous medals and diplomas as testimonials of the superiority of her methods, and her system was used the leading industrial schools and colleges of the country. Delegates from the Pratt Institute, Brooklyn, New York, after investigating all the principal European methods, adopted Brown's system. It was one of the regular features of the Moody Schools, Northfield, Massachusetts, where young women were educated for missionary work.

Brown was an occasional contributor to the newspaper press.

In 1902 she wrote "Scientific dress cutting and making, "The Harriet A. Brown system," simplified and improved; directions for its use".

== Personal life ==
Harriet A. Brown married Albert G. Brown (1848–1935) and had two children: Walter G. (1871–1872) and Clara G. (1886–1895). She died in 1930 and is buried at Brown Cemetery, Voluntown, New London, Connecticut.
