= Rhenish Women's League =

German organisation

The Rhenish women's league (Rheinische Frauenliga) was an organisation set up by the Rheinische Volkspflege (Protectors of the Rhenish people) to bring together various primarily middle class women's organisations initially to campaign against the use of African troops by the French Army in the occupation of the Rhineland. The idea was initiated by a member of the Cologne-based Neven du Mont family and taken up by the civil servant Margarete Gärtner, who organised the first conference in Frankfurt am Main, 23–24 June 1920. The conference ratified her as the leader.

== Constituent organisations ==
The league was composed of the following organisations in May 1921:

- Katholischer Deutscher Frauenbund (Catholic Women's Federation)
- Evangelischer Frauenbund
- Israelitischer Frauenbund
- Frauenausschuss der christlichen Gewerkschaften (Women's Committee of the Christian Unions)
- Frauenausschuss der sozial-demokratischen Partei
- Bund Deutscher Frauenvereine (League of German Women's Associations)
- Rheinisch-Westf. Frauenverband
- Bezirksausschuss f. Frauenarbeit
- Verband Hessische Frauenvereine
- Inter.-Kath. Verband d. Frauenvereine i. Saargebeit
- Stadtverband Düsseldorf
- Verband Kölner Frauenvereine (Association of Cologne Women's Associations)
- Kath. Frauenbund f. d. Pfalz
- Verein f. Fraueninteressen u. Neustädter Frauenvereine
- Allgemeiner deutscher Frauenverein Worms
- Gesamtverband d. Frauenvereine d. Kreises Ottweiler
- Stadtverband f. Jugendfürsorge Wiesbaden
- Verein Frauenbildung-Frauenstudium
- Verein d. kath. Sozialbeantinnen
- Verein d. kath. Oberlehrerinnen
- Verein d. kathkaufm. Gehilfinnen Köln
- Verein d. kathkaufm. Gehilfinnen Weisbaden
- Verein kath. Hausangestellten
- Allgemeiner deutscher Lehrerinnen-verein
- Verband d deutscher Reichs-Post-und Telegrafenbeamtinnen
- Verband weibl. Handels-u.-Büroangestellten-Berlin
- Stadtverband für Frauenbestrebungen
- Kath. Jungfrauenvereine
- Kath. Bahnhofsmission
- Nationalverband d. kath. Mädchenschutzverein
- Kath. Fürsorgeverein Speyer
- Evangelischer Frauenhilfe Wiesbaden
- Evangelischer Frauenhilfe Speyer
- Verband Evangelischer deutscce Bahnhofsmission
- Rheinische Frauenhilfe
- Allgemeiner deutscher HausFrauenverein (Association of German Housewives)
