= Harriet Connor Brown =

American women's rights activist and author

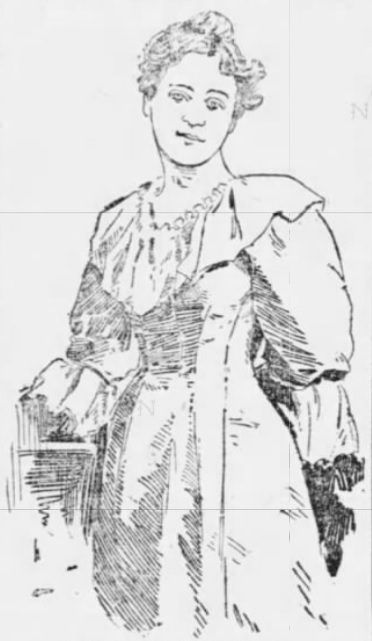
- Harriet Connor Brown, 1894
- Born: Harriet Chedie Connor; September 11, 1872; Burlington, Iowa, US
- Died: July 9, 1962 (aged 89); Ithaca, New York, US
- Occupations: Women's rights activist and author

Harriet Connor Brown (September 11, 1872 – July 9, 1962) was an American women's rights activist and an author. She was the first woman to win the Woodford Prize from Cornell University. Brown wrote for multiple newspapers and the United States government. Her book Grandmother Brown's Hundred Years, 1827–1927 won the Atlantic Monthly Prize in 1929.

== Personal life and early career ==
Harriet Connor Brown was born as Harriet Chedie Connor on September 11, 1872, in Burlington, Iowa. She went to Wheaton Seminary in Norton, Massachusetts, over a winter before attending Cornell University. She was a part of the university's newspaper The Cornell Era in 1893. She was the first woman editor to be on the newspaper's staff and was the first woman that won the Woodford Prize in oration from Cornell University with a speech based on religious thought titled "The Letter and the Spirit". The Woodford Prize is the highest award that can be given to Cornell University students. The five students that she competed against were all male. She graduated from Cornell in 1894 and studied in Berlin for a year after receiving a scholarship from the Association of Collegiate Alumni. While in Berlin, the German government awarded her a teacher's certificate. She taught at a Burlington High School for a year. She had a daughter and a granddaughter. Brown died on July 9, 1962, in Ithaca, New York.

== Later career ==
Brown began journalism in 1896, working for the New-York Tribune, the New York Journal, and the Buffalo Enquirer. After marrying Herbert D. Brown in 1897, they worked together to write reports for government agencies such as the Civil Service, Congress, and William Howard Taft's Commission on Economy and Efficiency. From 1903 to 1907, Brown wrote the press bulletin for the United States Geological Survey. She was a part of missions in the Caribbean. As part of the Women's International League for Peace and Freedom, Brown testified to the United States Congress in 1921 and 1922 to eliminate funding for the Chemical Warfare Service due to how much money families spend on war, women wanting to abolish all funding for the military's future wars, and being against non-combatants being killed by chemical warfare.

== Publications ==
Brown wrote Grandmother Brown's Hundred Years, 1827–1927 which is about the pioneer life of her mother-in-law Maria Dean Foster Brown in Fort Madison, Iowa. The book won the Atlantic Monthly Prize and $5,000 in 1929 "for the most interesting biography of any kind, sort, or description." The book is based on an interview she had on her mother-in-law's 99th birthday. Allene Sumner of the Rock Island Argus said, "Because Harriet Connor Brown – of Washington, D. C., was not too busy to listen to the tales of older people, not too interested in and sure of the superiority of everything modern and a little scornful of any worth in the good old days, she has won fame and fortune." Former Vice President Charles G. Dawes said,

Here is a fine picture of the New England character as it reacted 200 years after the landing of the Pilgrim Fathers to a new environment. The book is more than that. It is an epic of American life in the early and later days of the middle west.

Brown also wrote Report on the Mineral Resources of Cuba in 1901 for the U. S. Geological Survey, World Disarmament in 1921 for the U.S. Government Printing Office, and America Menaced by Militarism, An Appeal to Women.
