= Casement Report =

1904 report on atrocities in the Congo

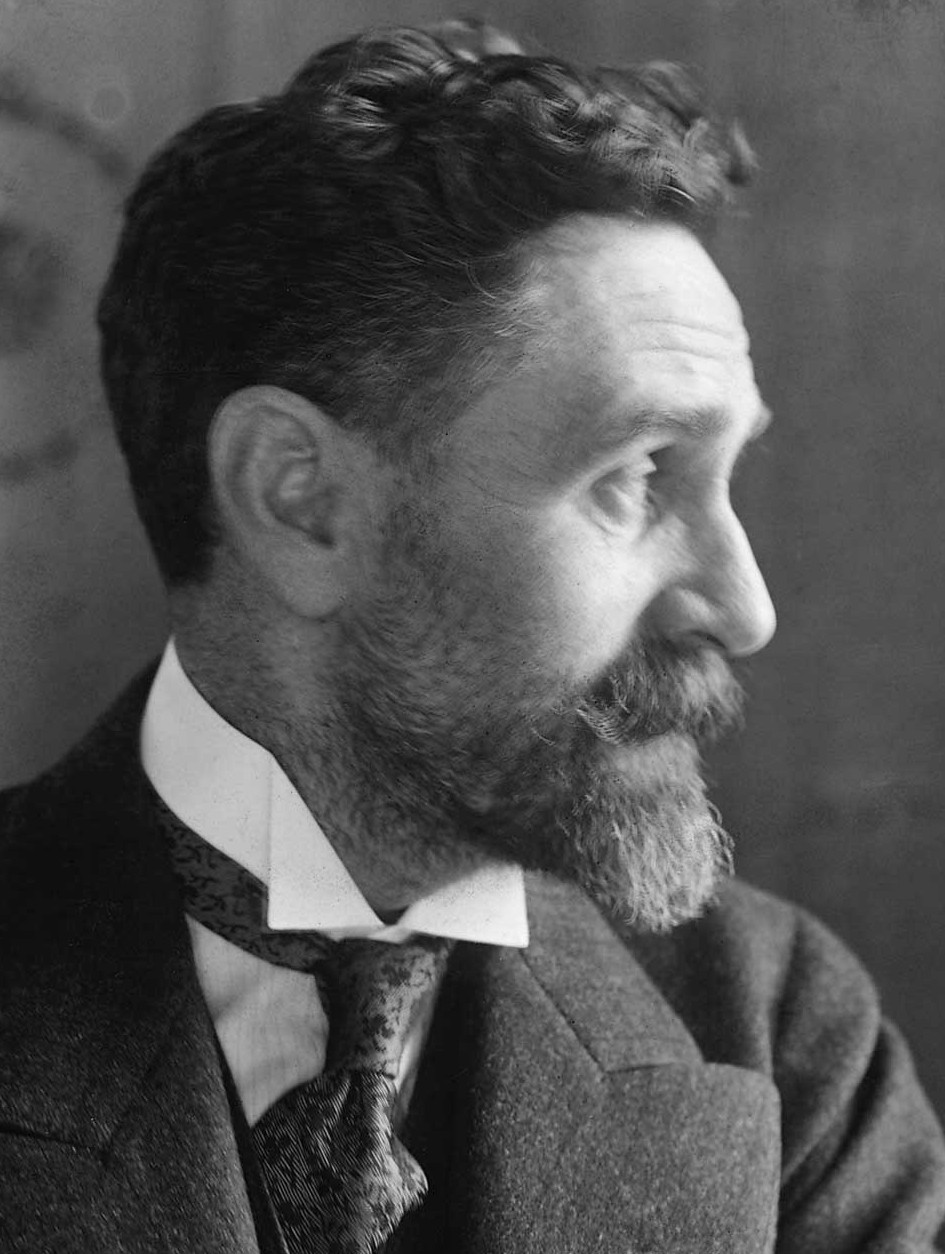
Roger Casement

The Casement Report was a 1904 document written at the behest of the British Government by Roger Casement (1864–1916)—a British diplomat and future Irish independence fighter—detailing abuses in the Congo Free State which was under the private ownership of King Leopold II of Belgium. This report was instrumental in Leopold finally relinquishing his private holdings in Africa. Leopold had held ownership of the Congolese state since 1885, granted to him by the Berlin Conference, in which he exploited its natural resources (mostly rubber) for his own private wealth.

== Background ==
=== Stokes Affair ===
Through intercepted letters, Captain Hubert-Joseph Lothaire, the commander of the Congo Free State forces in the Ituri-campaign, learned that Charles Stokes (born in Dublin) was on his way from German East Africa to sell weapons to the Zanzibari slavers in the eastern Congo region. Stokes was arrested and taken to Captain Lothaire in Lindi, who immediately formed a Drumhead court-martial. Stokes was found guilty of selling guns, gunpowder and detonators to the Congo Free State's Afro-Arab enemies. On 14 January 1895 he was sentenced to death and was hanged the next day (hoisted on a tree).

To Lothaire, Charles Stokes was no more than a criminal whose hanging was fully justified. Lord Salisbury, the British Prime Minister at the time, commented that if Stokes was in league with Arab slave-trading, then 'he deserved hanging'. Sir John Kirk, for years the British Consul in Zanzibar, remarked that "he was no loss to us, although he was an honest man." The news of Stokes' execution was received with indifference by the British Foreign Office. When the German ambassador asked Sir Thomas H. Sanderson, the Permanent Under-Secretary of State for Foreign Affairs, whether the British government planned to take any steps regarding the execution of this "well-known character", Sanderson wrote: "I do not quite understand why the Germans are pressing us."

In August 1895, the attention of the British press was drawn to this case by Lionel Decle, a journalist for the Pall Mall Gazette. The press began to report on these events in great detail, The Daily News emphasized 'bloodthirsty precipitation', The Times a 'painful and disgraceful death', The Liverpool Daily Post 'horrified amazement through the British race', The Daily Telegraph 'death like a dog', adding, "Have we all been wrong in believing that the most audacious foreigner – not to speak of any savage chief – would think once, twice and even trice, before he laid hands on a subject of Queen Victoria?".

As a result, the case became an international incident, better known as the Stokes Affair. Together, Britain and Germany pressured the Congo Free State to put Lothaire on trial, which they eventually did, a first trial was held in the city of Boma. The Free State paid compensation to the British (150,000 francs) and Germans (100,000 francs) and made it impossible by decree to impose martial law or death sentences on European citizens. Stokes's body was returned to his family.

Lothaire was acquitted twice, first in April 1896 by a tribunal in Boma. In August 1896, the appeal was confirmed in Brussels by the Supreme Court of Congo, paving the way for the rehabilitation of Lothaire.

The Stokes Affair mobilized British public opinion against the Congo Free State. It also damaged the reputation of King Leopold II of Belgium as a benevolent despot, which he had cultivated with so much effort. The case helped encourage the foundation of the Congo Reform Association – by Roger Casement and E. D. Morel – which in its turn put pressure on the Belgian government, which helped lead to the annexation of the Congo Free State by the Belgian state in 1908.

=== Publicity 1895–1903 ===
E. D. Morel

For many years prior to the Casement Report there were reports from the Congo alleging widespread abuses and exploitation of the native population. In 1895, the situation was reported to Dr Henry Grattan Guinness (1861–1915), a missionary doctor. He had established the Congo-Balolo Mission in 1889, and was promised action by King Leopold later in 1895, but nothing changed. H. R. Fox-Bourne of the Aborigines' Protection Society had published Civilisation in Congoland in 1903, and the journalist E. D. Morel also wrote several articles about the Leopoldian government's behaviour in the Congo Free State.

On 20 May 1903 a motion by the Liberal Herbert Samuel was debated in the British House of Commons, resulting in this resolution:

... That the Government of the Congo Free State having, at its inception, guaranteed to the Powers that its Native subjects should be governed with humanity, and that no trading monopoly or privilege should be permitted within its dominions, this House requests His Majesty's Government to confer with the other Powers, signatories of the Berlin General Act by virtue of which the Congo Free State exists, in order that measures may be adopted to abate the evils prevalent in that State.

Subsequently, the British consul at Boma in the Congo, the Irishman Roger Casement was instructed by Balfour's government to investigate. His report was published in 1904, confirmed Morel's accusations, and had a considerable effect on public opinion.

Casement met and became friends with Morel just before the publication of his report in 1904 and realized that he had found the ally he had sought. Casement convinced Morel to establish an organization for dealing specifically with the Congo question. With Casement's and Dr. Guinness's assistance, he set up and ran the Congo Reform Association, which worked to end Leopold's control of the Congo Free State. Branches of the association were established as far away as the United States.

== Report ==
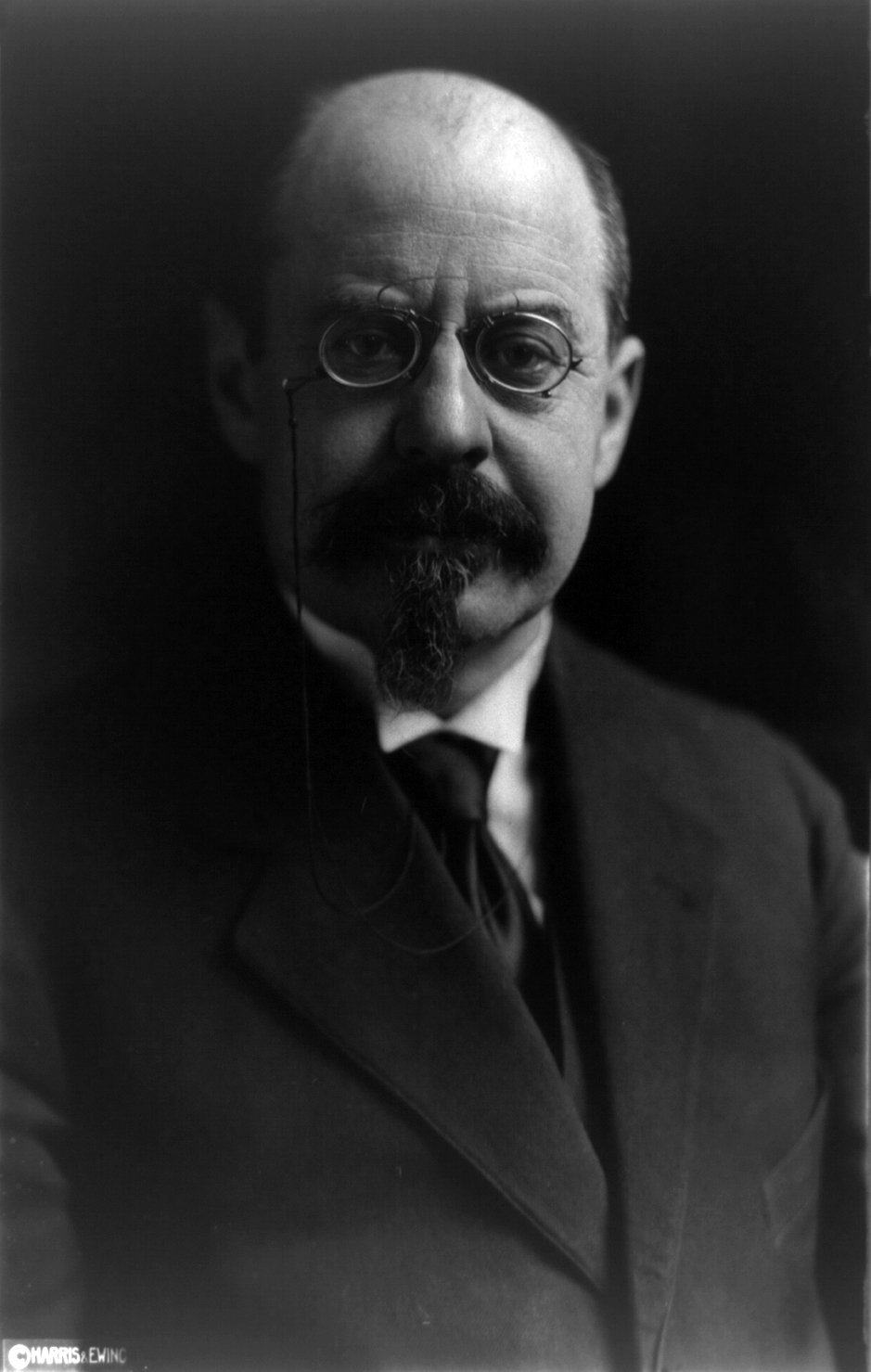
Emile Vandervelde

The Casement Report comprises forty pages of the Parliamentary Papers, to which is appended another twenty pages of individual statements gathered by Casement as Consul, including several detailing grim tales of killings, mutilations, kidnappings and cruel beatings of the native population by soldiers of the Congo Administration of King Leopold. Copies of the Report were sent by the British government to the Belgian government as well as to nations who were signatories to the Berlin Agreement in 1885, under which much of Africa had been partitioned. The British Parliament demanded a meeting of the fourteen signatory powers to review the 1885 Berlin Agreement.

While the Report was issued as a Command paper in 1904, and was laid before the Houses of Parliament, the original was not published in full until 1985, in an annotated book by two Belgian professors of the history of colonialism.

The Belgian Parliament, pushed by socialist political leader and statesman Emile Vandervelde and other critics of the King's Congolese policy, forced a reluctant Leopold II to set up an independent commission of enquiry. Its findings confirmed Casement's report in every detail. This led to the arrest and punishment of officials who had been responsible for murders during a rubber-collection expedition in 1903 (including one Belgian national who was given a five-year sentence for causing the shooting of at least 122 Congolese natives).

== Aftermath ==
Despite these findings, Leopold managed to retain personal control of the Congo until 1908, when the Parliament of Belgium annexed the Congo Free State and took over its administration as the Belgian Congo. However the final push came from Leopold's successor King Albert I, and in 1912 the Congo Reform Association had the satisfaction of dissolving itself.
