= Congo Free State propaganda war =

Campaign waged by adherents and critics of the Congo Free State

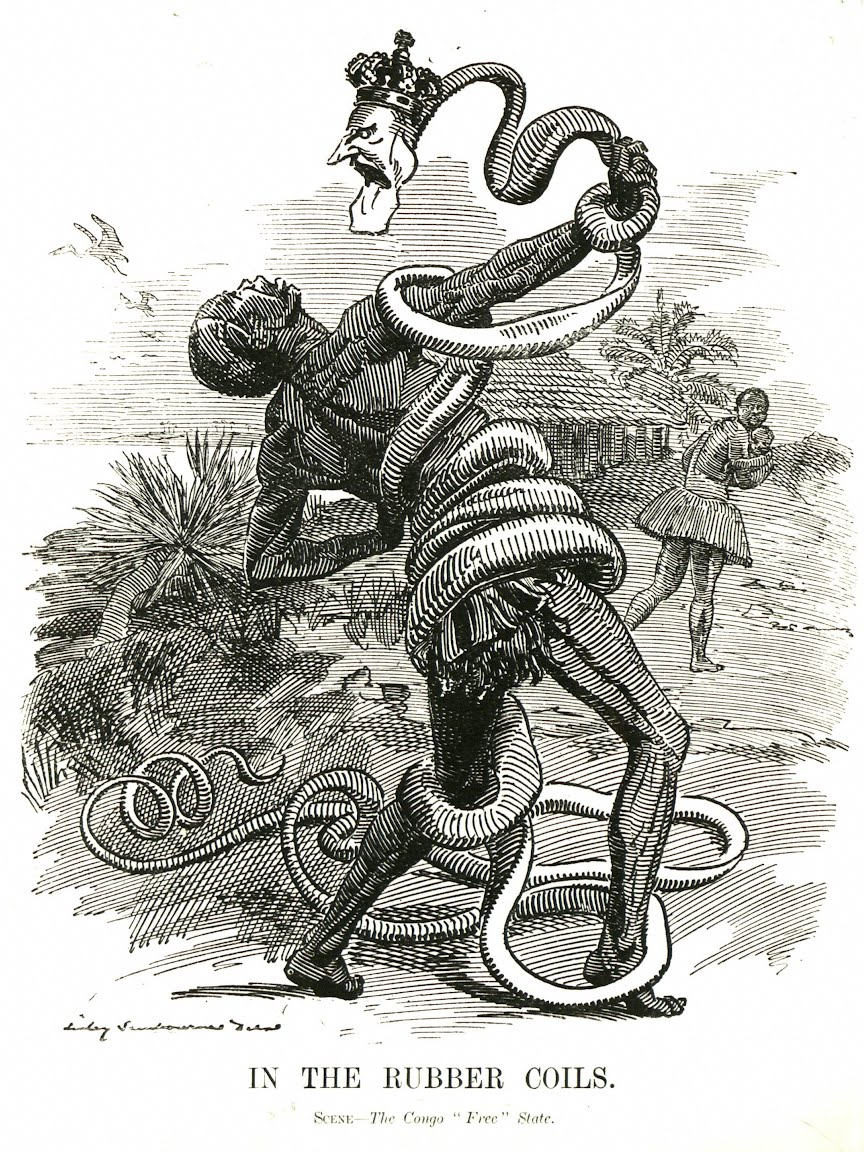
Cartoon in Punch, 1906

The Congo Free State propaganda war was a worldwide media propaganda campaign waged by both King Leopold II of Belgium and the critics of the Congo Free State and its atrocities. Leopold was very astute in using the media to support his virtual private control of the Congo. British campaigner Edmund Dene Morel successfully campaigned against Leopold and focused public attention on the violence of Leopold's rule. Morel used newspaper accounts, pamphlets, and books to publish evidence from reports, eye-witness testimony, and pictures from missionaries and others involved directly in the Congo. As Morel gained high-profile supporters, the publicity generated by his campaign eventually forced Leopold to relinquish control of the Congo to the Belgian government.

== Background ==
The Congo Free State propaganda war (1884–1912) occurred at the height of European imperialism. Demand for goods drove European imperialism, and the European stake in Asia was confined largely to trading stations and strategic outposts necessary to protect trade. The advent of industrialization, however, dramatically increased European demand for raw materials which were scarce in Europe. The severe Long Depression of the 1870s provoked a scramble to develop new markets for European industrial products and financial services. European nations became determined to exploit the natural resources of Africa and develop new markets there.

=== Leopold's acquisition ===
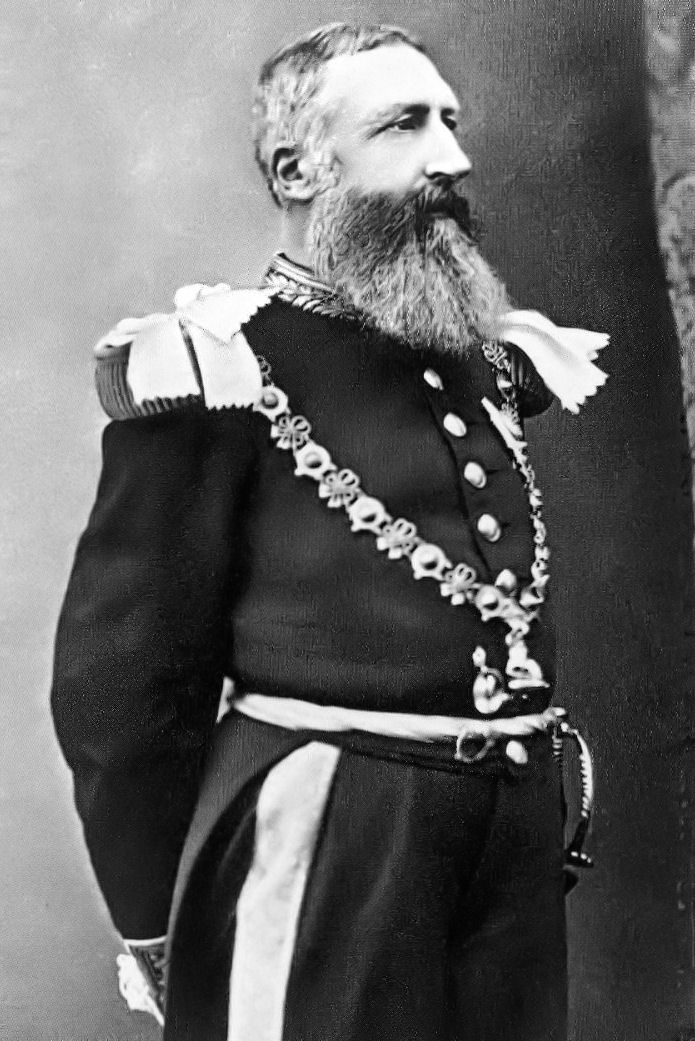
King Leopold II in the late 19th century

Leopold thought overseas colonies were of critical importance to become a great power, and worked to establish colonial possessions for Belgium. The national legislature did not authorize the colonial enterprise, and Leopold eventually acquired a colony in the Congo for himself with money loaned by the Belgian government for the purpose.

After a number of unsuccessful schemes for colonies in Africa and Asia, he organized a private holding company in 1876, disguised as an international scientific and philanthropic association, called the International African Society (IAA). It had a flag and an executive council which he chaired. Leopold formulated and used the following explicit goals of the IAA to justify his ambitions in the Congo:

- to suppress the slave trade in Equatorial Africa,
- to unite the native tribes,
- to modernize the peoples of the Congo River,
- to bring morality and an understanding of sin to the natives,
- and to advance the economy of the region.

In 1878 Leopold's holding company hired the Welsh-American explorer Henry Morton Stanley to establish a colony in the region of the Congo. Before Stanley left for Africa, Leopold created an exploratory committee with funds of a million francs in gold. Chaired by Stanley, it promised to abide by the IAA's goals set forth by Leopold.

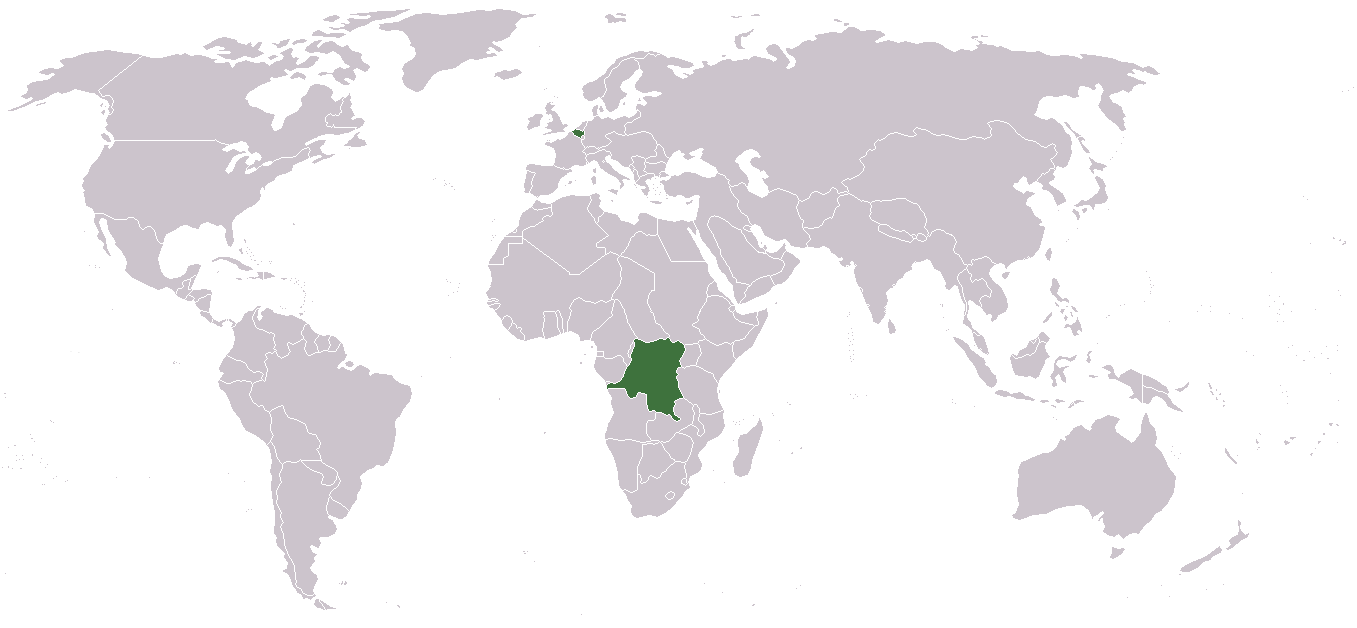
Location of the Congo Free State in relation to Belgium

During the spring of 1884, Leopold started a campaign to convince the Great powers that the Congo Free State should be a sovereign nation and he its head of state. Much diplomatic maneuvering resulted in the Berlin Conference of 1884–85, at which representatives of fourteen European countries and the United States recognized Leopold as sovereign of most of the area he and Stanley had laid claim to.

After the conference Leopold told the members and reporters:

To open up civilization the only part of our globe which it has not yet penetrated, to pierce the darkness in which entire populations are enveloped, is, I venture to say, a crusade worthy of its age of progress … Need I say that, in bringing you to Brussels, I have not been influenced by selfish views.

==== Using public diplomacy ====
Leopold "conceived the idea of a Congo Free State, with himself as the Sovereign ruler." The name suggested individual, economic, and religious freedoms. Leopold began a publicity campaign in Britain, drawing attention to Portugal's record of slavery to distract critics. He offered to drive slave traders from the Congo basin. He also secretly told British merchant houses that if he had formal control of the Congo, he would give Britain the same "most-favored-nation" status Portugal offered. At the same time, Leopold promised Otto von Bismarck he would not give any one nation special status, and that German traders would be as welcome as any other.

Leopold then offered France the Association's support for French control of the entire northern bank of the Congo River, and sweetened the deal by proposing that if his personal wealth proved insufficient to hold the entire Congo, as seemed inevitable, then control of the Congo would revert to France.

Leopold sent United States President Chester A. Arthur carefully edited copies of cloth-and-trinket treaties obtained by Stanley. He proposed that, as an entirely disinterested humanitarian body, the Association administer the Congo for the good of all, handing power to the local inhabitants as soon as they were ready for that grave responsibility. He worked to convince the United States, with its growing economic and military power, to recognize the treaties and the Congo Free State. Leopold's men told Southern congressmen that the Congo Free State could be a new home for freedmen from the Deep South. The politicians loved the idea. He promised the President open and free trade.

In April, the U.S. Congress decided that the treaties had legal standing and that the Congo was a sovereign state under the Belgian king. France's recognition soon followed, and then Germany, and soon all the other European nations. Since the IAA was seen as a legitimate government of a recognized sovereign state, Bismarck invited King Leopold to discuss African affairs with the Great Powers of Europe.

On November 15, 1884, the International Conference met to resolve "the African question" concerning the disposition of African territories among European powers. After long debate and ten sittings, the Great Powers agreed on borders for their colonies, without input from any African leader or thought to the deeply rooted ethnic and tribal politics. The Congo Free State encompassed nearly 2,600,000 square kilometres (1,000,000 sq mi), the largest claim in central Africa.

=== "Red Rubber" ===
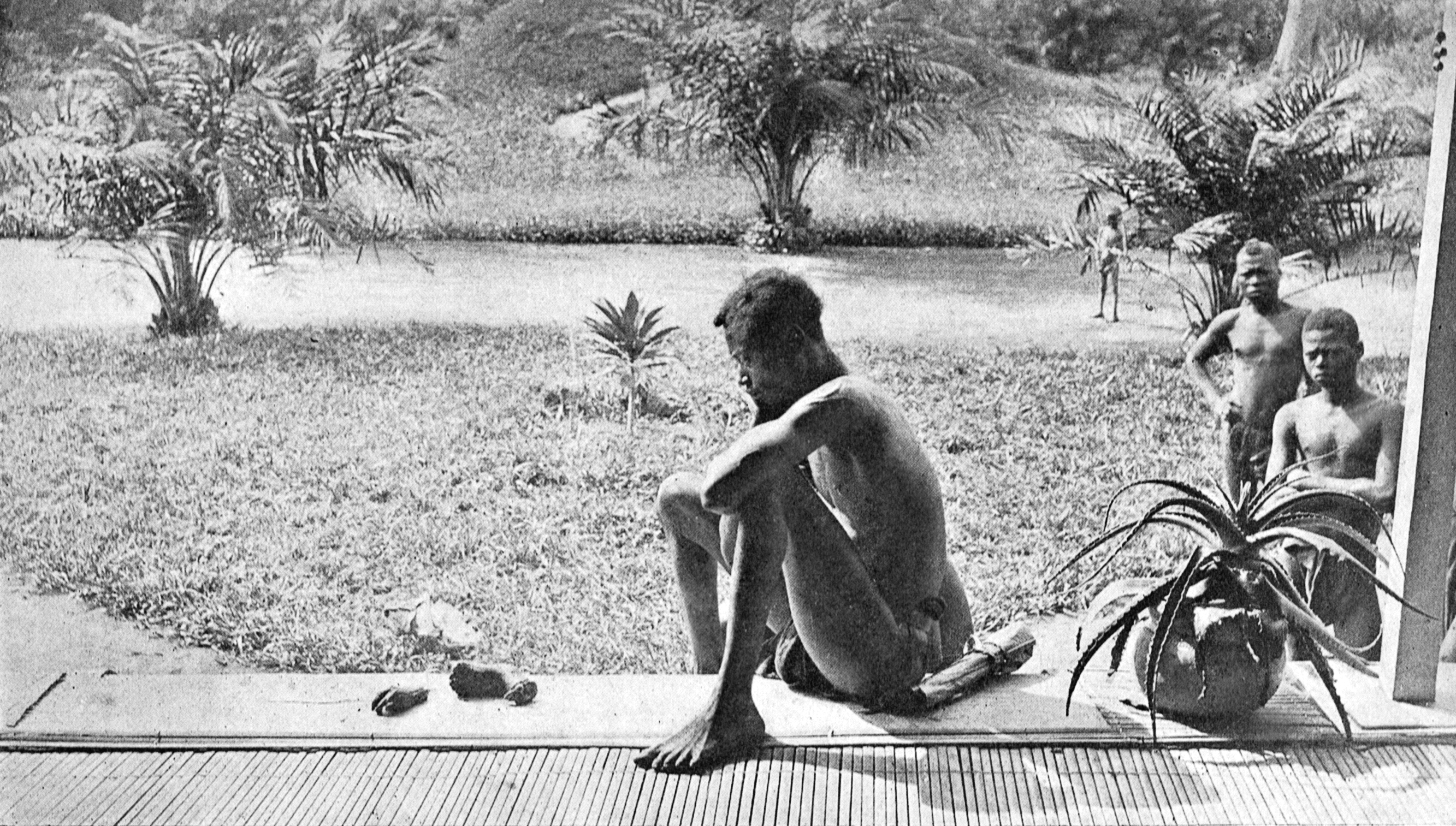
A photograph by Alice Seeley Harris titled "Nsala of Wala in the Nsongo District", depicting a father staring at the severed hand and foot of his five-year-old daughter who in 1904 was killed, cooked, and cannibalized by armed guards of a company holding a concession for rubber collection

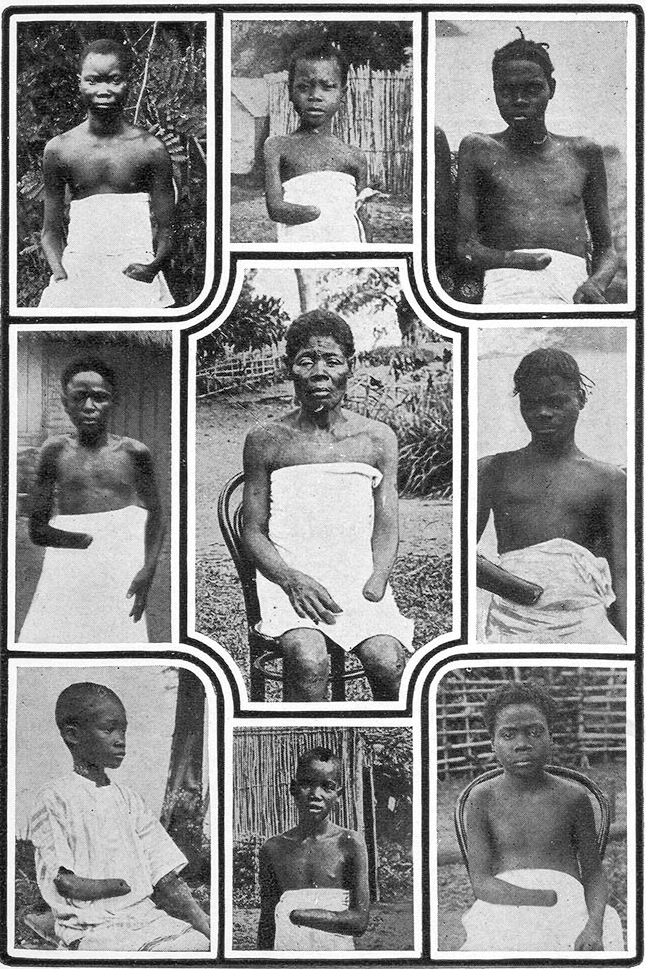
Mutilated Congolese children, image from King Leopold's Soliloquy, Mark Twain's political satire, where the aging king complains that the incorruptible camera was the only witness he had encountered in his long experience that he could not bribe. The book was illustrated with photographs by Harris.

Leopold profited from the ivory of the resource-rich Congo and even more from its rubber, a primary product of the Congo. Rubber vines grew throughout central Africa; but harvesting rubber from a vine was more difficult than that from a tree. So prices for African rubber went up, and Asian producers of less expensive rubber gained market share.

Consequently, Leopold demanded very high productivity from workers and a system of extracting rubber with minimal expense. Leopold's agents used forced labor or slave labor to get rubber and ivory, a clear violation of the Berlin Conference Act. To keep high production numbers constant, Leopold created an army of enforcers called the Force Publique (FP) in 1885, when he ordered creation of military and police forces. In 1886, he sent a number of Belgian officers and non-commissioned officers to the territory to create this military force.

==== Humanitarian disaster ====
The Force Publique became slave drivers, forcing people to work for nothing. They also enforced Leopold's law forbidding the sale of rubber and ivory to foreign nations. The FP's methods included mutilation, village destruction, killings, and mass murder to motivate the slaves and locals to higher outputs. Cutting off right hands and daily slave whippings were most common.

This brutality would later be dubbed "Red Rubber", in reference to the blood of Africans. The FP caused millions of deaths, perhaps tens of millions, and even more widespread mutilation.

Leopold denied knowing any of these details. Belgian professor Daniël Vangroenweghe estimated Leopold gained 1,250 million present day euros from the exploitation of the Congolese people, mainly from rubber. Other Belgian sources calculated that the profits from the Congolese exploitation prior to 1905 were some 500 million present-day euros..

Rubber yielded huge profits for the state and for companies like the Abir Congo Company. The value of Abir shares went from 500 francs (1892 gold francs) to 15,000 gold francs in 1903. The dividend in 1892 was 1 franc. In 1903 the dividend was 1,200 francs, more than double of the original price of a share.

== The media war ==
=== The missionaries and the Congo ===
King Leopold allowed several hundred foreign Protestant missionaries from Britain, the United States, and Sweden to travel to the Congo. Leopold welcomed the missionaries into the colony, given that their presence would help legitimize his rule to the outside world. The missionaries travelled to the Congo to evangelize, to fight polygamy, and to create a fear of sin in Africans. But the Congolese would run and hide at the mere sight of a European.

One British missionary wrote that his African congregation asked, "Has the Savior you tell us of any power to save us from the rubber trouble?" Other missionaries became aware of bloody events around their posts. One Swedish missionary noted a sorrowful song about death and tyranny that many sang at his post. Some missionaries began to protest the violence through personal letters to Leopold, as well as through letters to newspapers and magazines. Their efforts had little effect in drawing public attention to the situation.

==== William Sheppard ====
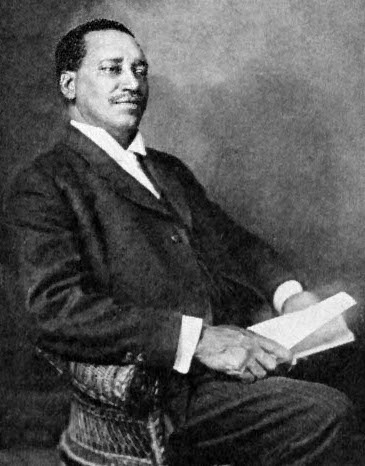
William Sheppard

In the late 1880s William Sheppard, an African-American Protestant missionary, started to write to American newspapers and magazines about the mutilations and murder that he witnessed. With threats of taxation and deportation, Leopold put a stop to Sheppard's writing. Leopold subsequently demanded that missionaries direct all concerns to him and not to the press.

==== E. V. Sjöblom ====
Swedish Baptist missionary E. V. Sjöblom spoke of the atrocities to all who would listen. In 1896 he published in the Swedish press a detailed article on the Congo's rubber industry, and this was reprinted elsewhere. He spoke about the brutality of the Force Publique at a public meeting attended by the press. Congo State officials counterattacked with newspaper articles, letters, and comments from Leopold in the Belgian and British press, and quickly silenced Sjöblom.

==== George Washington Williams ====
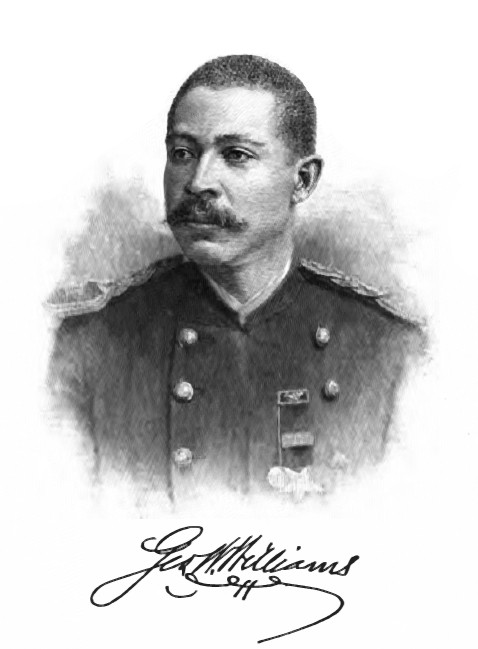
George Washington Williams (October 16, 1849 – August 2, 1891)

Colonel George Washington Williams served in the Union army during the Civil War. Williams entered a seminary and became a pastor. After moving to Washington, D.C., he started a national black newspaper, the Commoner. The newspaper folded and so did one in Cincinnati. He became a well-respected historian through his writings and lectures.

In 1889, Williams began writing for the European press syndicate. After an interview with Leopold, Williams went to the Congo to see "Christian civilization" in action. In early April 1891 Williams wrote a letter to Leopold entitled An Open Letter to His Serene Majesty Leopold II, King of the Belgians and Sovereign of the Independent State of Congo about the suffering of the region at the hands of Leopold's agents. The letter helped sway European and American public opinion against the Congo regime. Williams' last pages accuse Leopold of a list of crimes, including manipulation of the general public. He voiced his disbelief: "How thoroughly I have been disenchanted, disappointed, and disheartened."

He then wrote A Report upon the Congo-State and Country to the President of the Republic of the United States of America describing how Leopold had manipulated the United States. By the time President Benjamin Harrison received his copy, the open letter had appeared in European and American newspapers. On 14 April 1891, The New York Times ran a front-page article on the full list of allegations.

==== Leopold vs. Williams ====
Leopold's Public Relations Minister employed newspaper editors to run articles about the good deeds of Leopold. Leopold himself gave interviews about his dreams and aspirations for the Congo and its future.

One day after The New York Times article, Leopold's supporters in America submitted an article that accused Williams of living a lie and committing adultery. During the late summer of 1891 the Belgian Parliament defended Leopold and gave a 45-page report to the press circuit, effectively refuting Williams's accusations. Williams died on August 2 with his reputation tarnished.

The missionaries who witnessed the atrocities had little media savvy or political clout. The public readily dismissed Leopold's critics from British humanitarian societies as relics of past battles like Abolitionism. And those critics, like the missionaries, became dismissed as people who were always upset about something in some obscure corner of the world.

=== Alfred Jones ===
A powerful shipping magnate, Sir Alfred Lewis Jones was employed by Leopold in consular duties representing the Congo Free State. In 1891, in order to dampen British criticism of human rights abuses in the Congo, he sponsored the travels of novelist May French Sheldon. While in the Congo, she traveled on steamboats owned by the state and its company allies, who controlled where she went and what she saw. When she returned to England, Jones placed her articles in the newspapers. She stated "I have witnessed more atrocities in London streets than I have ever seen in the Congo."

E. D. Morel later wrote that "Had Sir Alfred Jones come forward as the defender of the Congolese, the Congo tragedy would have been terminated long years ago."

=== E. D. Morel ===
E. D. Morel

In 1891, Morel became a clerk with Elder Dempster, a Liverpool shipping firm run by Sir Alfred Jones, of whom he later became a bitter enemy. In 1893, to increase his income and support his family, Morel began writing articles against French protectionism, which was damaging Elder Dempster's business. Influenced by Mary Kingsley, an English traveller and writer who showed sympathy for African peoples and respect for different cultures, he became critical of the Foreign Office for not supporting African decolonisation movements.

Elder Dempster had a shipping contract with the Congo Free State for the run between Antwerp and Boma. Groups such the Aborigines' Protection Society had already begun a campaign against atrocities in Congo. Due to his fluency in French, Morel was often sent to Belgium, where he saw internal accounts of the Congo Free State held by Elder Dempster. Knowing that ships from Belgium to the Congo carried only guns, chains, ordnance, and explosives, but no commercial goods, while ships arriving from the colony came back full of valuable products such as raw rubber and ivory, made him realise Congo Free State's exploitative nature.

==== Newspapers ====
West African Mail, the main media outlet for Morel, started as a small newspaper consisting of Morel's articles, letters from missionaries, maps, cartoons, and pictures; all "to meet the rapidly growing interest in west and central African questions". John Holt, a businessman and Morel's long time friend, helped fund the startup of the newspaper. Later other supporters invested.

Morel wrote a five-part series entitled Trading Monopolies in West Africa. He first wrote stories pertaining to free trade and native rights.

Free Trade in West Africa, free trade for all; free trade for the Englishmen in a French colony, and in a German colony… There is plenty of room for the free, unfettered commerce of all the Powers of Europe of the Western Continent of Africa, and the greater [the natives], the attractions given to the trade in an individual colony… the more certain the contentment and the producing power of its inhabitants.

But then he began to write about slavery, using adjectives like evil, bloody, vicious, horrific and violent:

- "The rubber shipped home by the Congo companies… is stained with blood of hundreds of negroes."
- "This hideous structure of sordid wickedness," he called it.
- "Blood is smeared all over the Congo State, its history is blood-stained, its deeds are bloody, the edifice it has reared is cemented in blood—the blood of unfortunate negroes, spilled freely with the most sordid of all motives, monetary gain."

Morel also published in major British and Belgian papers. A book entitled Civilization in Congo-land, by H.R. Fox Bourne, secretary of the Aborigines Protection Society, published in January 1903, reinforced Morel's argument. Various organizations passed resolutions demanding Government action. Sir Charles Dilke took many of these concerns to Parliament for discussion.

==== Pamphlets ====
In 1903 Morel wrote his first pamphlet, The Congo Horrors, which reached a larger general public than before. He emphasized the religious implications, free trade abuses, and accused Leopold. "It has come to my conclusion that the murders and profiteering of the Congo are a result of neglect to civilize, and King Leopold is the proprietor." This pamphlet caught the eye of prominent officials in the British government such as Sir Charles Dilke and Roger Casement.

Morel continued to write pieces such as The Scandal of the Congo, The Treatment of Women and Children of the Congo (published in America in the African Studies Journal), and The New African Slavery (published in the International Union of London). They contained information and testimony from the missionaries of the brutality. The public began to pressure Parliament to do something about the atrocities.

Later in 1903, Morel brought out a pamphlet of 112 pages entitled The Congo Slave State, perhaps the strongest and fiercest indictment published. It contained a full and detailed description of Leopold's system in all the divisions of the Congo. It also had maps, reports from Parliament, and descriptions of atrocities. Sir Charles Dilke introduced copies of the pamphlet into Parliament. It caused considerable sensation, and resolutions passed against slavery in the Congo.

==== Books ====
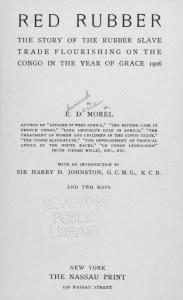
Morel's exposé Red Rubber

Before 1904, Morel released two books pertaining to West Africa. The first book, entitled Affairs of West Africa, discussed the history, inhabitants, flora and fauna, physical characteristics, industries, and trade and finances of the area; all from a man who'd never gone to West Africa. He got his information from traders and shipping crews during his days working for Elder Dempster, and from his missionary contacts. Morel concluded his book with attacks on Leopold and the Congo Free State administration. He contrasted the Congo Free State to the success of the French Congo, commemorating the French administration for their efforts within their West African colonies. He then asked for sympathy and understanding, from the British and French, on the issue of West Africa.

Newspapers reviews were mixed. In The Daily Chronicle Sir Harry Johnston wrote:

Mr. Morel's indictment is one of the most terrible things ever written, if true.

The Times also provided a glowing review of the book:

It is with great satisfaction that the public will welcome a contribution to our general knowledge on the subject… The sufferings of which the picture was given to the world in Uncle Tom's Cabin are as nothing to those which Mr. Morel represents to be habitual accomplishments of the acquisition of rubber and ivory by the Belgian companies.

Positive reviews helped create readership for his writings. A bad review from the Morning Post pertained to the comparison of the French Congo to Leopold's Congo Free State. Morel responded with another book, The British Case in the French Congo, released three months later, in which he said he admired the French efforts, and again blamed the Congo Free State for the evil in West Africa. Even the Morning Post praised the second book. The public demanded government action. Thus on May 20, 1903, Parliament passed a resolution to allow the British government to negotiate with the other Great powers over the matter. Parliament noted that "great gratitude was due" to Morel for creating public awareness.

His third book, King Leopold's Rule in Africa, had photographs of mutilated women and children. Though he mostly let the pictures speak for themselves, he wrote effectively. "Over and over again in his book did Morel hammer in the argument." Morel argued that the world must come together to fight for the end of the abuses.

In the name of humanity, of common decency and pity, for honour's sake, if for no other cause, will not the Anglo-Saxon race – the Governments and the peoples of Great Britain and the United States, who between them are primarily responsible for the creation of the Congo State – make up their minds to handle this monstrous outrage resolutely, and so point the way, and set an example which others would then be compelled to follow? In that hope, with an ever present consciousness of inadequacy to portray the greatness of the evil and the greatness of responsibility, the author submits this volume to the public.

His words and facts from the book appeared in book reviews all over Europe and the U.S. The reviewers described the horrific pictures and stories in full detail.

==== Congo Reform Association ====
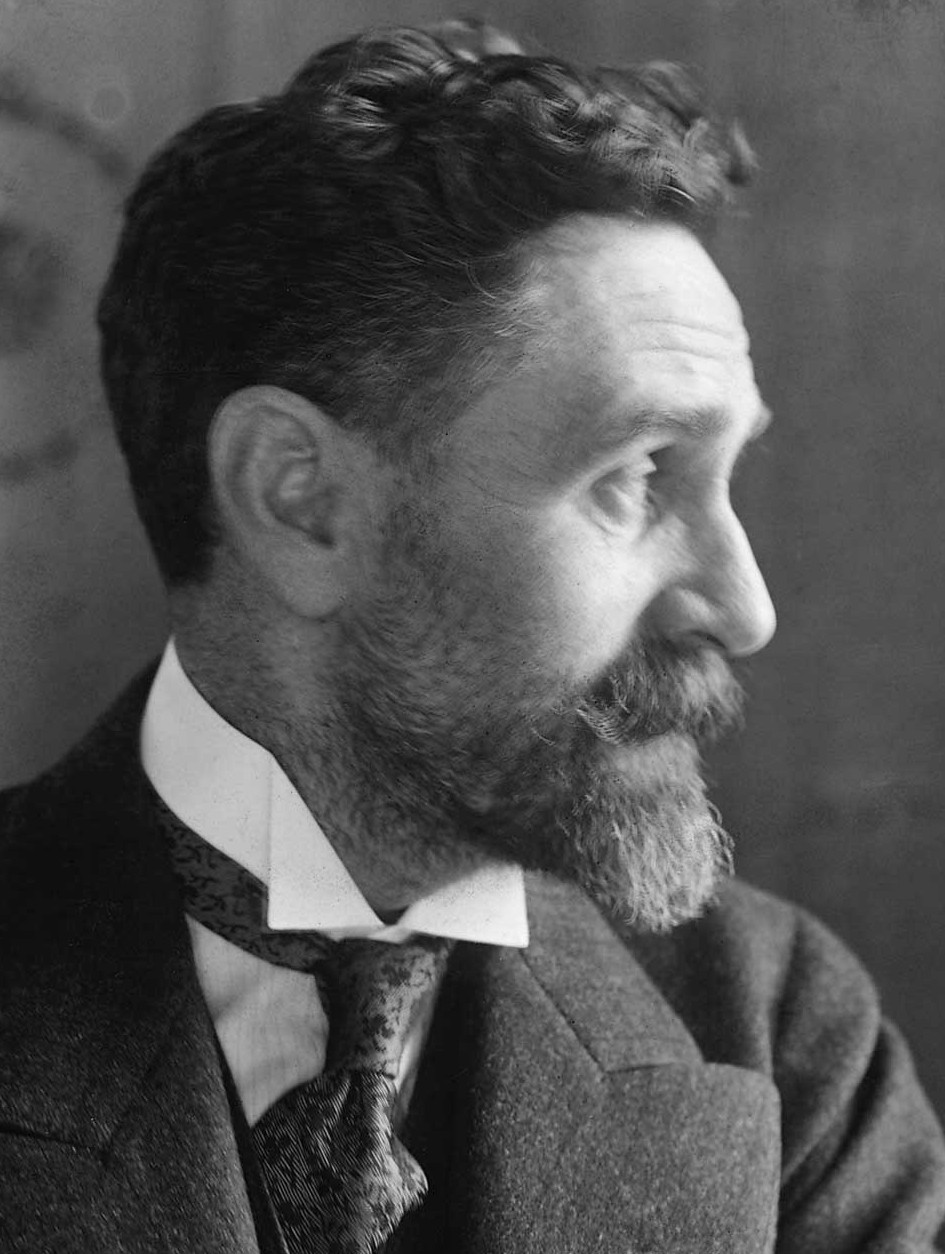
Roger Casement.

As Morel's writings stirred public feelings for the "Congo Question" within Great Britain, Parliament created an international commission to investigate. Roger Casement, a British Consul to Africa and an acquaintance of Morel, went to the Congo and wrote a report for the British Government. Casement interviewed missionaries, natives, riverboat captains, and railroad workers and returned with a detailed report of the appalling situation. The report produced a profound and widespread feeling in Britain that the administrative system of the Congo State must be reformed. The British government commended Casement for his work and knighted him. Morel published the Casement Report in The West African Mail. Newspapers around the world reported on the Casement Report.

Casement and Morel met in Dublin to discuss the situation. Casement convinced Morel to form an organization to combat Leopold's abuses in the Congo. In November 1903, the Congo Reform Association (CRA) emerged. Casement put forward £100 as a start up fund. Morel went back to Liverpool to begin the new organization. He drew inspiration from Conrad's Heart of Darkness, and called it "the most powerful thing ever written on the subject". Casement deliberately abstained from attending the launch of the Congo Reform Association at the Philharmonic Hall in Liverpool on March 23, 1904, because he did not want his celebrity to be the only reason people joined.

The founding manifesto began with an impressive list of names including the African businessman and entrepreneur John Holt, the historian John Morley, the Presbyterian Minister Reverend R. J. Campbell and the Quaker philanthropist W. A. Cadbury of the Cadbury Chocolate Corp. Others included four bishops and a dozen influential peers of the realm.

The manifesto called for "secure just and humane treatment of the inhabitants of the Congo State, and restoration of the rights to the land and of their individual freedom". No more than a week later, the Massachusetts Commission for International Justice organized the American branch of the Congo Reform Association with members including Mark Twain, Booker T. Washington, and W. E. B. Du Bois.

In September 1904, Morel arrived in New York for his American campaign, with a petition entitled The Memorial. The memorial contained signatures by all the members of the CRA. The purpose of the trip could be explained by Morel's own words during an interview for the New York Herald in 1903. When asked by the interviewer "Why America?" Morel answered:

America has a peculiar and very clear responsibility in the matter, inasmuch as the American Government was the first to recognize the status of the International Association (later the Congo State), and thereby paved the way for similar action on the part of the European Powers… It is to be hoped that President Roosevelt and the American people may help undo the grieves wrong, which was thereby unknowingly inflicted upon the native inhabitants of the Congo territories.

Before Morel left for America he submitted a copy of the memorial to The New York Times, the New York Post, The Washington Post, The Boston Globe, and other press syndicates. The CRA and Morel hoped that before his arrival there would be strong public support from the American citizens. All the newspapers covered his arrival and displayed excerpts of the memorial. His articulate speeches throughout New England earned Morel an audience with President Theodore Roosevelt. The New York Post covered the visit with a full page, two-column article. Through the continuous newspaper coverage Americans became curious about Morel and the "Congo Question". On October 7 Morel spoke in Boston about the International Peace Congress. His speech was compelling and motivating, and helped focus American public attention on the Congo.

The errand which has brought me to the United States is a very simple one. It is to appeal to you on behalf of the oppressed and persecuted peoples of the Congo, for whose present unhappy condition you, in America, and we, in England, have a great moral responsibility, from which we cannot escape and from which in honour we should not attempt to escape… It is my privilege to ask you who are met here in the cause of peace whether you will not lead a helping hand in staying the cruel and destructive wars – if the murder of helpless men and women can be dignified by such a name… In appealing to you on behalf of those millions of helpless Africans… It is a great responsibility that you have. If our duty is clear, surely yours is also clear. The African slave trade has been revived, and is in full swing in the Congo today. I ask you to help us to root it up and fling it out of Africa, and just as I have no doubt of the greatness and loftiness of your ideals, so I have no doubt of what your answer will be.

It would take two more years for President Roosevelt and Congress to get involved. In a letter to Henry Cabot Lodge, Roosevelt wrote: "The only tomfoolery that anyone seems bent on is that about the Congo Free State outrages, and that is imbecile rather than noxious." Overwhelmed by public pressure, Congress in 1906 took a stand against Leopold and demanded an end to the Congo Free State.

=== Leopold's counter campaign ===
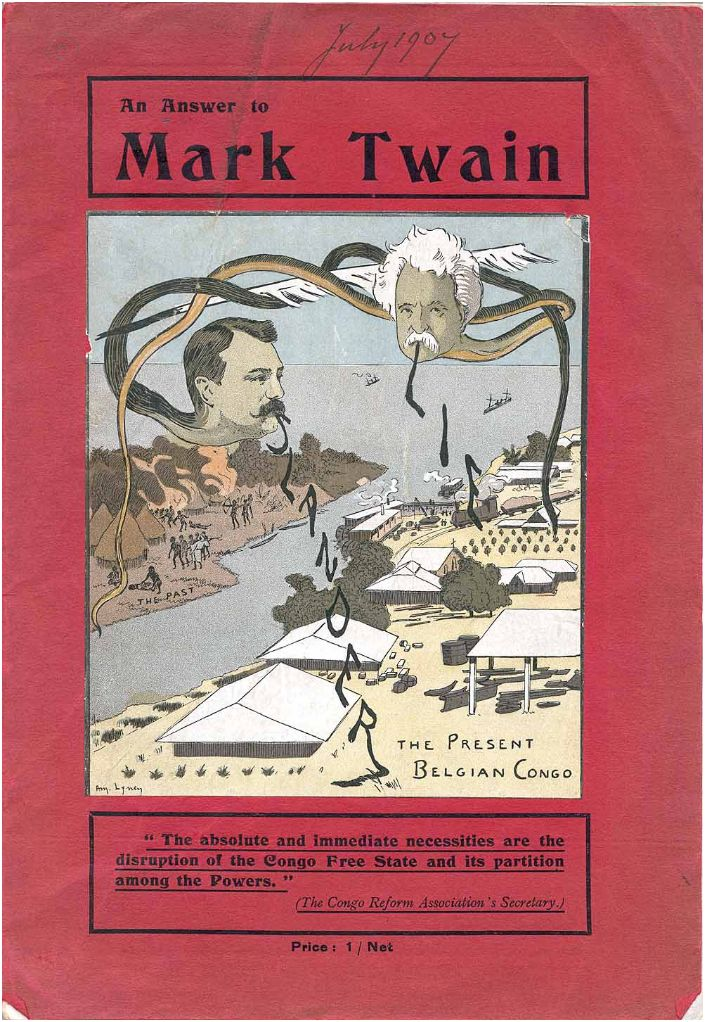
Front cover of An Answer to Mark Twain, anonymously published in Brussels (1907) in reply to King Leopold's Soliloquy. Pictured are Mark Twain and E. D. Morel.

Leopold ordered counterattacks refuting all the claims that Morel made. He had his propaganda machine write articles for major newspapers, including The New York Times, as well as numerous letters to the editor.

Discrediting Morel and the CRA had not worked. Leopold commissioned an internal investigation of the Congo to prove to the public that he cared. A committee of Congo officials issued reports that denied any atrocities. Morel collected letters, photos, and testimony from the Congolese, for an extensive media blitz of pamphlets, newspaper articles, letters and books.

Leopold's response included articles countering the claims, but he also sent agents to spy on Morel during his American visit. Mark Twain released King Leopold's Soliloquy, which talked about the abuses and Leopold's denial. Twain wrote it from the perspective of Leopold. "They burst out and call me 'the king with ten million murders on his soul'". Throughout the book, Twain portrays Leopold as guilty and evil. "Well...no matter, I did beat the Yankees, anyway! There is comfort in that. [Reads with a mocking smile, the President's Order of Recognition of April 22, 1884]". Twain's account presents the image of a disingenuous Leopold plotting and scheming to keep the truth from coming out.

Leopold's agents countered with letters to the editor and a book entitled An Answer to Mark Twain. In the book they call Twain and Morel liars and manipulators. "Truth shines forth in the following pages, which summarily show what the Congo Free State is." "All the Mr. Twain and Morel have said. Lies!" One of Leopold's hired lobbyists, Henry I. Kowalsky caused a sensation in December 1906 by making public all the communications between himself, Leopold, and the Congo State.

Leopold finally appointed a commission of inquiry, to investigate specific charges of the atrocities and reported abuses. The commission included members of the Belgian Parliament and lower officials in the government.

==== The downfall ====
Leopold released press statements about the commission hoping to quell the public uproar. However, Leopold wanted a private, not a published, report. The commission returned with the most evidence of abuse yet – interviews with over a hundred natives and numerous missionaries, documents from the Force Publique detailing deaths and mutilations inflicted, and documents from the Congo State administration documenting the abuses and proving that Leopold profited more than he reported.

The CRA obtained the report, and published it in The West African Mail, The New York Times, the Associated Press, and European press agencies. The report, Evidence Laid Before the Congo Commission of Inquiry, also became a pamphlet distributed by the CRA throughout Europe and the United States. Leopold could not refute his own commission's findings. Leopold yielded the Congo Free State to Belgium in exchange for a financial settlement in 1908. He died, aged 74, the following year.

== See also ==
- Political warfare
- Public diplomacy
- Public relations

== Bibliography ==
=== Primary ===
- Anonymous. An Answer to Mark Twain. New York : A&G Bulens Brothers, 1906.
- Boulger, Demetrius Charles de Kavanagh. The Congo State Is Not a Slave State; A Reply to Mr. E.D. Morel's Pamphlet Entitled "The Congo Slave State". London: S. Low, Marston and Co., 1903. Google Digitized Books. (Accessed March 3, 2008.)
- Congo Reform Association. Evidence Laid Before the Congo Commission of Inquiry at Bwembu, Bolobo, Lulanga, Baringa, Bongandanga, Ikau, Bonginda, and Monsembe: Together with a Summary of Events (and Documents Connected Therewith) on the A.B.I.R. Concession Since the Commission Visited that Territory. University of California: Richardson & Sons, Printers, 1905.
- King Leopold's Rule of Africa. New York: Funk and Wagnalls Company, 1905.
- The Indictment Against the Congo Government. Liverpool Press, 1906.
- E. D. Morel's History of the Congo Reform Movement. Edited by Wm. Roger Louis and Jean Stengers. Oxford: Clarendon Press, 1968.
- Morel, Edmund Dene. The Black Man's Burden: The White Man in Africa from the Fifteenth Century to World War I. New York: Monthly Review Press, 1969.
- The British Case in French Congo; The Story of a Great Injustice, Its Causes and Its Lessons. New York: Negro Universities Press, 1969.
- The Congo Horrors. Liverpool, England: Liverpool Press, January 15, 1903.
- The West African Mail. Liverpool, England: Liverpool Press.
- Twain, Mark. King Leopold's Soliloquy: A Defense of His Congo Rule. New York: P. R. Warren, 1905.
- Williams, George Washington. "An Open Letter to His Serene Majesty Leopold II, King of the Belgians and Sovereign of the Independent State of the Congo". Reprinted in Franklin, John Hope. George Washington Williams: A Biography. Chicago: University of Chicago Press, 1985. 243–254.

=== Newspapers ===
- The Boston Globe
- The Daily Chronicle
- The Morning Post
- The New York Herald
- The New York Times
- The Times
- The West African Mail (The Organ of the Congo Reform Association)

=== Secondary ===
==== Monographs ====
- Anstey, Roger. King Leopold's Legacy: The Congo Under Belgian Rule. 1908–1960. London: Oxford University Press, 1966.
- Bourne, H.R. Fox. Civilisation in Congoland: A Story of International Wrong Doing. London: P.S. King and Son, 1903.
- Chapman, Jane. Comparative Media History: An Introduction : 1789 to the Present. New York: Polity, 2005.
- Cline, Catherine Ann. E.D. Morel, 1873–1924: The Strategies of Protest. Dundonald, Belfast: Blackstaff, 1980.
- Cocks, Frederick Seymour. E. D. Morel, the Man and his Work. London: G. Allen & Unwin ltd., 1920.
- Conrad, Joseph. Heart of Darkness: A Case Study in Contemporary Criticism. Edited by Ross C. Murfin. New York: St. Martin's Press, 1989.
- Diagna, Peter and L.H. Gann. The United States and Africa: A History. Cambridge: University Press, 1987.
- Dunne, Kevin C. Imagining the Congo: The International Relations of Identity. New York: MacMillan, 2003
- Ewans, Martin. European Atrocity, African Catastrophe: Leopold II, the Congo Free State and Its Aftermath. London: Routledge Curzon, 2002.
- Franklin, John Hope. George Washington Williams: A Biography. Chicago: University of Chicago Press, 1985.
- Hochschild, Adam. King Leopold's Ghost: A Story of Greed, Terror, and Heroism in Colonial Africa. New York: Houghton Mifflin Company, 1998.
- Robinson, Ronald. Africa and the Victorians: The Climax of Imperialism in the Dark Continent. New York: St. Martins Press, 1961.
- Singleton-Gates, Peter, Maurice Girodias, and Roger Casement. The Black Diaries: An Account of Roger Casement's Life and Times with a Collection of His Diaries and Public Writings. Paris: Olympia Press, 1959.
- Slade, Ruth M.. King Leopold's Congo: Aspects of the Development of Race Relations in the Congo Independent State. London: Oxford University Press, 1962.
- Taylor, A.J.P. The Trouble Makers: Dissent over Foreign Policy 1792–1939. London: Hamish Hamilton, 1957.
- Wack, Henry Wellington. The Story of the Congo Free State: Social, Political, and Economic Aspects of the Belgian System of Government in Central Africa. New York: G.P. Putnam's Sons, 1905.
- Winks, Robin W., compiler. The Age of Imperialism. Englewood Cliffs, N.J: Prentice-Hall, 1969.
- Wynne, Catherine. The Colonial Conan Doyle: British Imperialism, Irish Nationalism, and the Gothic. London: Greenwood Publishing Group, 2002

==== Journals ====
- Anstey, Roger. "The Congo Rubber Atrocities – A Case Study." African Historical Studies, no. 4 (1971): 59–76.
- Baylen, Joseph O.. "Senator John Tyler Morgan, E.D. Morel, and the Congo Reform Association." The Alabama Review, no. 15 (1962): 117–132.
- Harms, Robert. "The End of Red Rubber: A Reassessment." The Journal of African History, no. 16 (1975): 33–88.
- Reeves, Jesse Siddall. "The International Beginnings of the Congo Free State." Johns Hopkins University Studies in Historical and Political Science 12, no. 11–12 (1894): 1–95.
