= Charles Stokes (trader) =

Irish missionary and arms dealer (1852-1895)

Charles Henry Stokes (Dublin, 1852 – near the Lindi River (Congo), 1895) was an Irish missionary turned trader who lived much of his life in Africa and was the centre of the Stokes Affair between the United Kingdom and the Congo Free State.

== Life ==
Charles was born in Dublin and went to school in Enniskillen before his father died when Charles was twenty. When this happened, he went with his mother to Liverpool, where he found work as a clerk for the Church Missionary Society. He decided to seek new horizons and trained as a lay evangelist with the Society in Reading. In May 1878 he arrived in Zanzibar. His first act was to set up a 300-strong vehicle caravan to the Great Lakes, because he wanted to Christianize Buganda. He was a skilled organizer and increasingly undertook expeditions.

In January 1883 he married in the Cathedral of Zanzibar to Ellen Sherratt, one of the nurses who were sent to him by the mission. She gave birth to their daughter Ellen Louise in March 1884, but died a week later. The following year Stokes got married again, to an African woman named Limi, a relative of the chief of the Wanyamwesi, a tribe that supplied many of the bearers in his caravans. This was highly unusual at the time. He also had two African concubines, Nanjala and Zaria, with whom he had two children. He was excommunicated by the Protestant Church and became a trader around central Africa, selling goods such as ivory.

Stokes was on good terms with the Arabo-Swahili and the British, and since 1890 with the Germans, trading with all of them. In 1894 he went for the first time with a large expedition to north-eastern Congo, with thousands of carriers and large quantities of guns and ivory. The Arabo-Swahili with whom he was trading were at war with the Congo Free State at the time and desperately needed weapons.

== Arrest, trial, execution ==
Through intercepted letters, Captain Hubert-Joseph Lothaire, the commander of the Belgian forces in the region, learned that Stokes was coming to the Congo to trade weapons. He sent Lieutenant Josué Henry with 70 men ahead to capture him. Henry took advantage of the absence of a large part of Stokes' caravan, who were scattered in the forest searching for food, and arrested him in his tent in December 1894. He was taken to Lothaire in Lindi, who immediately formed a drumhead court-martial. Stokes was found guilty of selling guns, gunpowder and detonators to the Belgians' Afro-Arab enemies (Kilonga Longa, Said Abedi and Kibonge). He was sentenced to death and was hanged the next day (hoisted on a tree).

The procedure is said to have had many irregularities, including false statements. There was no penal code, no clerk, the verdict was not read, and Stokes was not given to opportunity to appeal, although as a citizen he was entitled to do so.

== Aftermath ==
In August 1895, the press began to report in detail on this case, including in the Pall Mall Gazette by journalist Lionel Decle. As a result, the case became an international incident, better known as the Stokes Affair. Together, Britain and Germany pressured Belgium to put Lothaire on trial, which they did, in Boma. The Free State paid compensation to the British (150,000 francs) and Germans (100,000 francs) and made it impossible by decree martial or death sentences against Europeans. Stokes's body was returned to his family.

In April 1896 the court of Boma acquitted Lothaire after a short trial, in what is considered a questionable verdict. The appeal was confirmed by the Supreme Court of Congo in Brussels in August 1896, paving the way for the rehabilitation of Lothaire.

The Stokes Affair mobilized British public opinion against the Congo Free State. It also damaged the reputation of King Leopold II of Belgium as a benevolent despot, which he had cultivated with so much effort. The case helped encourage the foundation of the Congo Reform Association and the annexation of the Congo by the Belgian state in 1908.
