= Hubert Lothaire =

Belgian officer

Hubert Joseph Lothaire
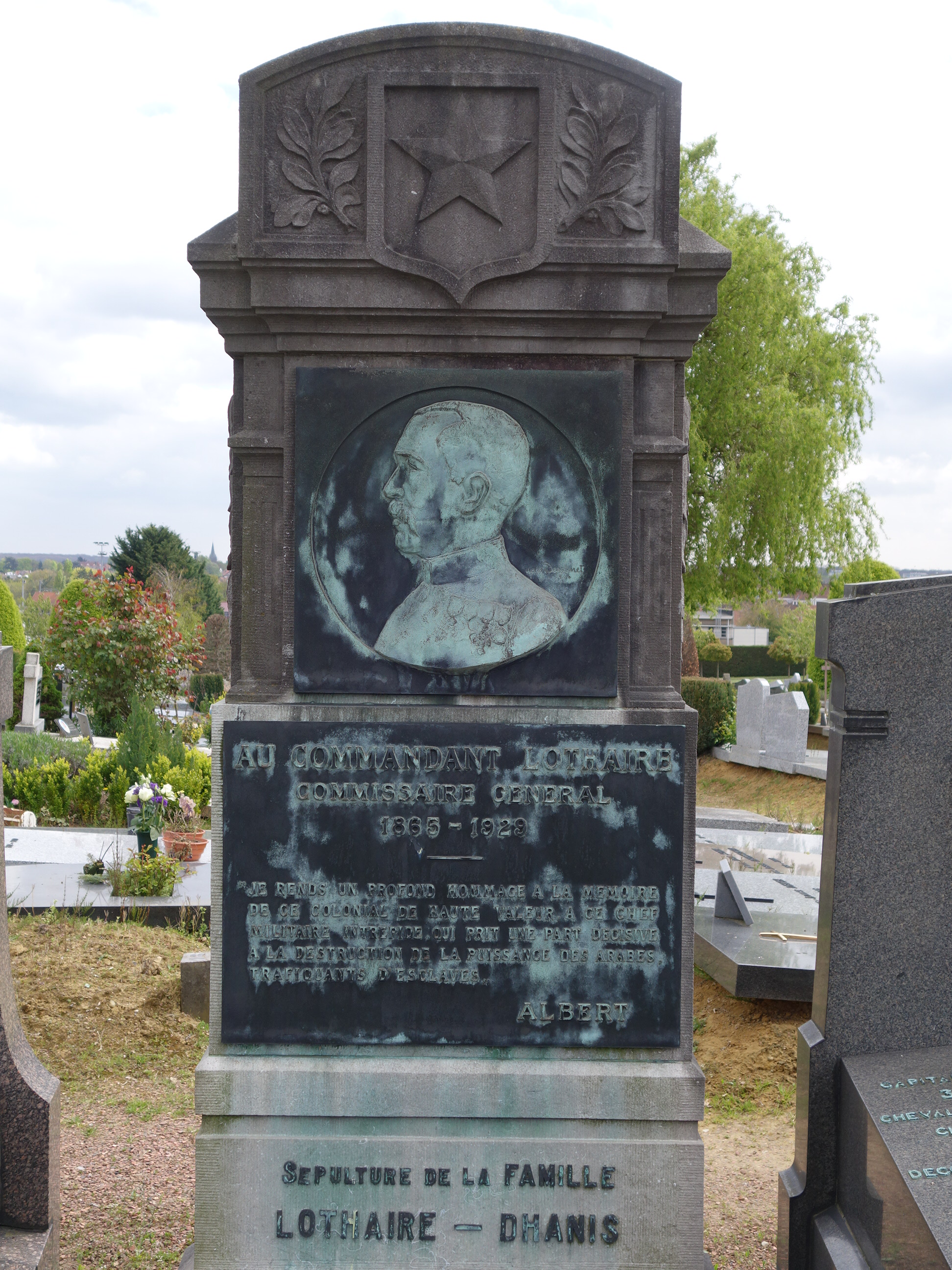
- Born: 10 November 1865; Rochefort, Belgium
- Died: 8 March 1929 (aged 63); Ixelles, Belgium
- Military career
- Allegiance: Belgium; Congo Free State
- Rank: Captain
- Conflicts: Congo Arab war

Hubert Joseph Lothaire (Rochefort, 10 November 1865 – Ixelles, 8 May 1929) was a Belgian officer who served in the Force Publique of the Congo Free State. He started his military career as a lieutenant in the Belgian infantry, later he entered service in the Force Publique, where he commanded Congo Free State forces during the Congo Arab war. Lothaire was married to the sister of Francis Dhanis. On 7 May 1894, Captain Francis Dhanis returned to Europe and Lothaire assumed command of the Force Publique in the 'zone arabe' in his stead.

== Charles Stokes trial ==
Through intercepted letters, Captain Hubert-Joseph Lothaire, the commander of the Congo Free State forces in the Ituri-campaign, learned that Charles Stokes was on his way from German East Africa to sell weapons to the Zanzibari slavers in the eastern Congo region. In December 1894, Lothaire sent Lieutenant Josué Henry with 70 men ahead to capture Stokes. Henry arrested Stokes in his tent, taking advantage of the absence of a large part of his caravan, that was out in the jungle gathering firewood and searching for food. Stokes was taken to Captain Lothaire in Lindi, who immediately formed a Drumhead court-martial. Stokes was found guilty of selling guns, gunpowder and detonators to the Congo Free State's Afro-Arab enemies (Said Abedi, Kilonga Longa and Kibonge). On 14 January 1895 he was sentenced to death and was hanged the next day (hoisted on a tree).

The procedure is said to have had many irregularities, including the use of false statements. There was no penal code, no clerk, the verdict wasn't read out loud to the convicted, and Stokes did not have a right of appeal, which as a British citizen he was entitled to.

== Initial reactions ==
To Lothaire, Charles Stokes was no more than a criminal whose hanging was fully justified. Lord Salisbury, the British Prime Minister at the time, commented that if Stokes was in league with Arab slave-trading, then 'he deserved hanging'. Sir John Kirk, for years the British Consul in Zanzibar, remarked that "he was no loss to us, although he was an honest man." The news of Stokes' execution was received with indifference by the British Foreign Office. When the German ambassador asked Sir Thomas H. Sanderson, the Permanent Under-Secretary of State for Foreign Affairs, whether the British government planned to take any steps regarding the execution of this "well-known character", Sanderson wrote: “I do not quite understand why the Germans are pressing us.”

== The Stokes Affair ==
In August 1895, the attention of the British press was drawn to this case by Lionel Decle, a journalist for the Pall Mall Gazette. The press began to report on these events in great detail, The Daily News emphasized 'bloodthirsty precipitation', The Times a 'painful and disgraceful death', The Liverpool Daily Post 'horrified amazement through the British race', The Daily Telegraph 'death like a dog', adding 'Have we all been wrong in believing that the most audacious foreigner -not to speak of any savage chief- would think once, twice and even trice, before he laid hands on a subject of Queen Victoria'.

As a result, the case became an international incident, better known as the Stokes Affair. Together, Britain and Germany pressured the Congo Free State to put Lothaire on trial, which they eventually did, a first trial was held in the city of Boma. The Free State paid compensation to the British (150,000 francs) and Germans (100,000 francs) and made it impossible by decree to impose martial law or death sentences on European citizens. Stokes's body was returned to his family.

Lothaire was acquitted twice, first in April 1896 by a tribunal in Boma. In August 1896, the appeal was confirmed in Brussels by the Supreme Court of Congo, paving the way for the rehabilitation of Lothaire.

The Stokes Affair mobilized British public opinion against the Congo Free State. It also damaged the reputation of King Leopold II of Belgium as a benevolent despot, which he had cultivated with so much effort. The case helped encourage the foundation of the Congo Reform Association and the annexation of the Congo Free State by the Belgian state in 1908.
