= Stokes affair =

1895 Congolese diplomatic incident

The Stokes affair (French: L'Affair Stokes) or the Stokes-Lothaire incident was a diplomatic incident between the Congo Free State and the United Kingdom in 1895. The affair emerged when Charles Stokes, an Irish trader and former Christian missionary, was arrested for illegal trading in the Congo and hanged without trial on 15 January 1895. The Belgian officer responsible for the execution, Captain Hubert Lothaire, was convinced that Stokes had been selling guns to Arab rebels in the Eastern Congo in exchange for ivory. Lothaire was accused by the British public of having failed to provide Stokes with due process of law. He was charged with murder in Belgium but was acquitted despite public outcry throughout the British Empire.

The Stokes affair mobilized British public opinion against the Congo Free State, also accused of systematic humanitarian abuses by a British report published in May 1895. The campaign would eventually result in the formation of the Congo Reform Association and the annexation of the Free State by Belgium as the Belgian Congo in 1908.

== Charles Stokes trial ==
Through intercepted letters, Captain Hubert-Joseph Lothaire, the commander of the Congo Free State forces in the Ituri-campaign, learned that Charles Stokes was on his way from German East Africa to sell weapons to Zanzibari slavers in the eastern Congo region. In December 1894, Lothaire sent Lieutenant Josué Henry with 70 men ahead to capture Stokes. Henry arrested Stokes in his tent, taking advantage of the absence of a large part of his caravan, that was out in the jungle gathering firewood and searching for food. Stokes was taken to Captain Lothaire in Lindi, who immediately formed a drumhead court-martial. Stokes was found guilty of selling guns, gunpowder and detonators to the Congo Free State's Afro-Arab enemies (Said Abedi, Kilonga Longa and Kibonge). On 14 January 1895 he was sentenced to death and was hanged the next day (hoisted on a tree).

The procedure is said to have had many irregularities, including the use of false statements. There was no penal code, no clerk, the verdict was not read out loud to the convicted, and Stokes did not have a right of appeal, which as a British citizen he was entitled to.

== Initial reactions ==
To Lothaire, Charles Stokes was no more than a criminal whose hanging was fully justified. Lord Salisbury, the British Prime Minister at the time, commented that if Stokes was in league with Arab slave-trading, then 'he deserved hanging'. Sir John Kirk, for years the British Consul in Zanzibar, remarked that "he was no loss to us, although he was an honest man." The news of Stokes’ execution was received with indifference by the British Foreign Office. When the German ambassador asked Sir Thomas H. Sanderson, the Permanent Under-Secretary of State for Foreign Affairs, whether the British government planned to take any steps regarding the execution of this "well-known character", Sanderson wrote: "I do not quite understand why the Germans are pressing us."

== The Stokes Affair ==
In August 1895, the attention of the British press was drawn to this case by Lionel Decle, a journalist for the Pall Mall Gazette. The press began to report on these events in great detail, The Daily News emphasized "bloodthirsty precipitation," The Times a "painful and disgraceful death," the Liverpool Daily Post the widely held "horrified amazement through the British race," and The Daily Telegraph "death like a dog," adding "Have we all been wrong in believing that the most audacious foreigner — not to speak of any savage chief — would think once, twice and even trice, before he laid hands on a subject of Queen Victoria."

As a result, the case became an international incident, better known as the Stokes Affair. Together, Britain and Germany pressured the Congo Free State to put Lothaire on trial, which they eventually did, a first trial was held in the city of Boma. The Free State paid compensation to the British (150,000 francs) and Germans (100,000 francs) and made it impossible by decree to impose martial law or death sentences on European citizens. Stokes's body was returned to his family.

Lothaire was acquitted twice, first in April 1896 by a tribunal in Boma. In August 1896, the appeal was confirmed in Brussels by the Supreme Court of Congo, paving the way for the rehabilitation of Lothaire.

The Stokes Affair mobilized British public opinion against the Congo Free State. It also damaged the reputation of King Leopold II of Belgium as a benevolent despot, which he had cultivated with so much effort. The case helped encourage the foundation of the Congo Reform Association and the annexation of the Congo Free State by the Belgian state in 1908.
