= Henry I. Kowalsky =

US defense attorney (1859–1914)

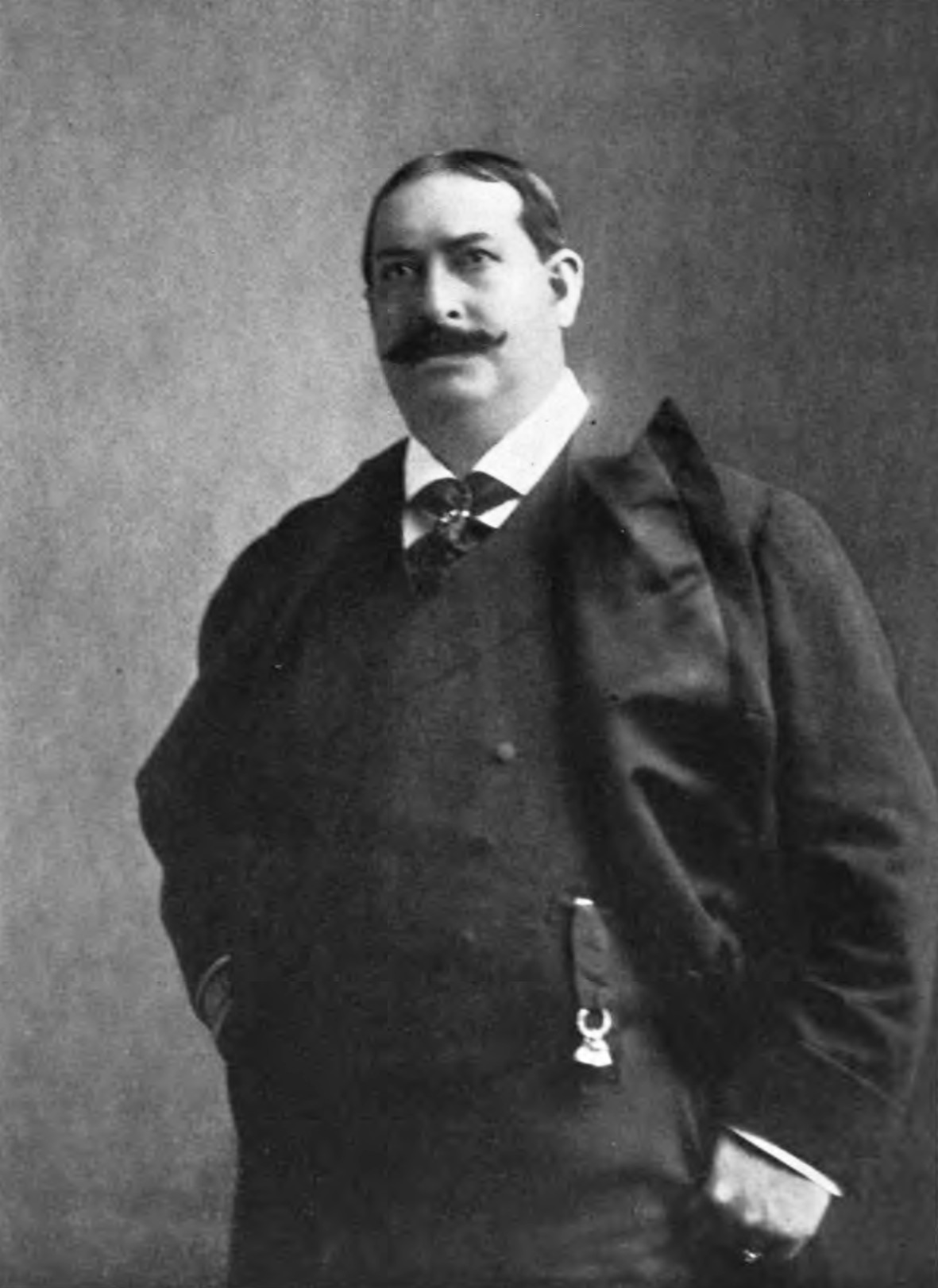
Colonel Henry I Kowalsky, circa 1899

Colonel Henry I. Kowalsky (August 16, 1859 - November 28, 1914) was a San Francisco defense attorney. He was employed by King Leopold II of Belgium as a lobbyist to the US government in favor of the Congo Free State. Kowalsky was known as "Colonel" without having ever been in the military. He earned the designation when he was appointed to, and served as, the Judge Advocate General for California Governor Robert Waterman.

== Biography ==
The fourth son of Levi and Fannie Kowalsky, Henry was born in Buffalo, New York on August 16, 1859. His family moved to San Francisco, California in 1866 to join his father who had been living in different areas around the state. Kowalsky attended Lincoln Grammar School in San Francisco until his graduation in 1874. His early attempt at business was short lived, selling his paper delivery route after only a few days of operation while still in school.

Kowalsky became the editor of a monthly magazine, originally called Our Boys Monthly Magazine, and later renamed Field and Fireside. Kowalsky's magazine became a success and he was praised for his leadership of the publication. It was discontinued, and he moved to Tomales, a small town in Marin County, California, and began working as a store clerk for his brother, Edward H. Kowalsky in 1872. Leaving the store in 1877, he and his brother became members of the United States Election Map Co., along with Henry C. Donnell and Charles S. Israel.

== King Leopold II controversy ==
Kowalsky sought out the friendship of the Belgian heir apparent, Prince Albert, during one of the Prince's trips to the United States. Through this friendship, Kowalsky was introduced to King Leopold II in December 1904.

King Leopold II was working to thwart negative press he was receiving in the United States, in regards to atrocities being committed in his personally owned Congo Free State. He needed someone with connections to the people who would shape the policy of the United States. The King hired Kowalsky with an annual retainer of 100,000 francs (over $2 million US in 2013 dollars). It seems however, that this new position raised the ire of Congo state officials already working in the US. After several months, Kowalsky gave them the ammunition they needed in order to work to remove him: getting into a fist fight with a creditor in open court. A year after signing it, the King let Kowalsky's hefty contract expire, embarrassing Kowalsky. He beseeched the King to reinstate it. As Kowalsky was becoming a burden, and an embarrassment to the Congo state, the King paid him off, reinstating the contract and adding 125,000 francs to go away quietly.

The payoff backfired, and for a week after December 10, 1906, newspapers across the country detailed the correspondence between Kowalsky, King Leopold II, and the Congo state. This was a dreadful turn of events for the King, leading directly to joint efforts between the United States and Great Britain to end his one-man rule in the Congo.
