= Léonard Kakudji Muzinga =

Congolese Catholic prelate (born in 1970)

The Most Reverend Léonard Kakudji Muzinga
- Bishop of Kamina, Democratic Republic of the Congo
- Church: Catholic Church
- Archdiocese: Roman Catholic Archdiocese of Lubumbashi
- See: Roman Catholic Diocese of Kamina
- Appointed: 11 November 2023
- Installed: 2 February 2024
- Predecessor: Jean-Anatole Kalala Kaseba
- Successor: Incumbent

Orders
- Ordination: 31 July 2005
- Consecration: 2 February 2024 by Fulgence Muteba Mugalu
- Rank: Bishop

Personal details
- Born: Léonard Kakudji Muzinga; 13 March 1970 (age 55); Kalemie, Diocese of Kalemie-Kirungu, Tanganyika Province, DR Congo

Styles of Léonard Kakudji Muzinga
- Reference style: Your Lordship; The Most Reverend
- Spoken style: His Lordship
- Religious style: Archbishop

Léonard Kakudji Muzinga (born 13 March 1970) is a Congolese Catholic prelate who serves as Bishop of the Roman Catholic Diocese of Kamina, in the Democratic Republic of the Congo, since 11 November 2023. Before that, from 31 July 2005 until he was appointed bishop, he was a priest of the Roman Catholic Archdiocese of Lubumbashi in the DR Congo. He was appointed bishop on 11 November 2023 by Pope Francis. He was consecrated and installed at Kamina, on 2 February 2024.

== Background and education ==
He was born on 13 March 1970 in Kalemie. He studied philosophy and theology in the Saint Paul Major Seminary in Kambikila, Lubumbashi, he was ordained a priest on 31 July 2005 for the archdiocese of Lubumbashi.

== Priest ==
He was ordained a priest of Lubumbashi on 31 July 2005. He served as priest until 11 November 2023.

While a priest, he served in various roles and locations including as:

- Parish vicar of Saint Joseph Parish from 2005 until 2012.
- Director of the Institut Technique Saint François Xavier in Likasi from 2005 until 2012.
- Head of youth pastoral care in the Likasi sector from 2007 until 2011.
- Parish priest of Saint Paul Parish in Lubumbashi from 2012 until 2023.
- Chaplain and referent for Sisters of the Bakhita Family from 2013 until 2023.
- Episcopal vicar for diocesan works in Lubumbashi from 2019 until 2021.
- Member of the diocesan Board for Economic Affairs in 2023.

== As bishop ==
On 11 November 2023, Pope Francis appointed him as bishop of the Roman Catholic Diocese of Kamina, DRC. He was consecrated and installed at Kamina, on 2 February 2024 by the hands of Archbishop Fulgence Muteba Mugalu, Archbishop of Lubumbashi assisted by Bishop Gaston Kashala Ruwezi, Bishop of Sakania-Kipushi and Bishop Richard Kazadi Kamba, Bishop of Kolwezi.

== See also ==
- Catholic Church in the Democratic Republic of the Congo

== Succession table ==
Catholic Church titles
Preceded by Jean-Anatole Kalala Kaseba (22 January 1990 - 3 December 2020)	Bishop of Kamina (since 11 November 2023)	Succeeded by Incumbent
