= Désiré Lenge Mukwenye =

Congolese Catholic prelate (born 1966)

The Most Reverend Désiré Lenge Mukwenye
- Bishop of Kilwa-Kasenga, Democratic Republic of the Congo
- Church: Catholic Church
- Archdiocese: Roman Catholic Archdiocese of Lubumbashi
- See: Roman Catholic Diocese of Kilwa-Kasenga
- Appointed: 17 January 2024
- Installed: 10 March 2024
- Predecessor: Fulgence Muteba Mugalu
- Successor: Incumbent

Orders
- Ordination: 31 July 1994
- Consecration: 10 March 2024 by Fulgence Muteba Mugalu
- Rank: Bishop

Personal details
- Born: Désiré Lenge Mukwenye; 2 March 1966 (age 60) Lwanza, Diocese of Kilwa-Kasenga, Haut-Katanga Province, DR Congo

Styles of Désiré Lenge Mukwenye
- Reference style: Your Lordship; The Most Reverend
- Spoken style: His Lordship
- Religious style: Bishop

Désiré Lenge Mukwenye (born 2 March 1966) is a Congolese Catholic prelate who is the Bishop of the Roman Catholic Diocese of Kilwa-Kasenga in the Democratic Republic of the Congo since 17 January 2024. Before that, from 31 July 1994 until he was appointed bishop, he was a priest of the Roman Catholic diocese of Kilwa-Kisenga in the DR Congo. He was appointed bishop on 17 January 2024 by Pope Francis. He was consecrated as bishop at Kilwa on 10 Mar 2024.While still a priest, he served as Apostolic Administrator of Kilwa-Kisenga Diocese from Jul 2021 until January 2024.

== Background and education ==
He was born on 2 March 1966 in Lwanza. He studied philosophy and theology at the Saint-Paul Major Seminary in Kambikila, Lubumbashi. He spent one year at Saint-André Parish in Kilwa. From 2003 until 2008, he studied at the Pontifical Gregorian University in Rome, Italy, where he graduated with a Licentiate in biblical theology. In 2016, he received a Doctorate in theology from the same university.

== Priest ==
He was ordained a priest of the Diocese of Kilwa-Kasenga on 31 July 1994. He served as a priest until 17 January 2024.

While a priest, he served in various roles including as:

- Parish priest of the Saint Charles Lwanga parish in Lupembe from 1994 until 1998.
- Procurator of the diocese of Lubumbashi from 1998 until 2002.
- Coadjutor of Santa Maria della Speranza, in the Diocese of Rome from 2003 until 2008.
- Collaborator in the parishes of Immacolata Concezione and Spirito Santo in Torre Annunziata, archdiocese of Naples from 2008 until 2011.
- Doctoral research fellow in Münster, Germany from 2011 until 2012.
- Lecturer and spiritual director in the Saint-Paul Seminary of Lubumbashi from 2013 until 2016.
- Provincial secretary for formation and studies from 2016 until 2019.
- Vicar General of the diocese of Kilwa-Kasenga from 2018 until 2021.
- Rector of the Université Technologique Katumba Mwanke from 2016 until 2024.
- Professor at the seminary of Lubumbashi from 2016 until 2024.
- Diocesan administrator of Kilwa-Kasenga from 2021 until 2024.

== Bishop ==
Pope Francis appointed him Bishop of Kilwa-Kasenga on 17 January 2024. He was consecrated and installed at Kilwa on 10 Mar 2024 by the hands of Archbishop Fulgence Muteba Mugalu, Archbishop of Lubumbashi assisted by Bishop Vincent de Paul Kwanga Njubu, Bishop of Manono and Bishop Gaston Kashala Ruwezi, Bishop of Sakania-Kipushi. He succeeded Archbishop Fulgence Muteba Mugalu, who had been transferred to the archdiocese of Lubumbashi and appointed archbishop there on 22 May 2021.

== See also ==
- Catholic Church in the Democratic Republic of the Congo

== Succession table ==
Catholic Church titles
Preceded by Fulgence Muteba Mugalu (18 March 2005 - 22 May 2021)	Bishop of Kilwa-Kasenga (since 17 January 2024)	Succeeded by Incumbent
