= Jean-Christophe Amade Aloma =

Congolese Catholic prelate (born in 1961)

The Most Reverend Jean-Christophore Amade Aloma
- Bishop of Kalemie-Kirungu, Democratic Republic of the Congo
- Church: Catholic Church
- Archdiocese: Roman Catholic Archdiocese of Lubumbashi
- See: Roman Catholic Diocese of Kalemie-Kirungu
- Appointed: 31 March 2015
- Installed: 7 June 2015
- Predecessor: Dominique Kimpinde Amando
- Successor: Incumbent

Orders
- Ordination: 25 July 1990
- Consecration: 7 June 2015 by Jean-Pierre Tafunga Mbayo
- Rank: Bishop

Personal details
- Born: Jean-Christophore Amade Aloma; 18 January 1961 (age 64) Mune, Diocese of Bunia, Democratic Republic of the Congo
- Coat of arms

Styles of Jean-Christophore Amade Aloma
- Reference style: Your Lordship; The Most Reverend
- Spoken style: His Lordship
- Religious style: Bishop

Jean-Christophore Amade Aloma M.Afr. (born 18 1961) is a Congolese Catholic prelate who is the bishop of the Roman Catholic Diocese of Kalemie-Kirungu in the Democratic Republic of the Congo, since 31 March 2015. Prior to that, from 25 July 1990, he was a priest of the same Catholic Diocese. He was appointed bishop by Pope Francis. He was consecrated and installed at Kalemie, on 7 June 2015. He is a member of the Missionaries of Africa.

== Background and education ==
Christophe Amade was born on 18 January 1961 in Mune, Diocese of Bunia, Ituri Province in the Democratic Congo. From 1967 until 1973, he attended elementary school at Bidri and Nyaguma. From 1973 until 1979, he attended Jean XXIII Minor Seminary in Vida, in the Diocese of Mahagi-Nioka and a college in Ovoa. While a seminarian, he taught at the Institut Technique Agricole in Laybo in the Roman Catholic Diocese of Mahagi-Nioka, from 1979 until 1981. He studied Philosophy at the Notre Dame de la Ruzizi Major Seminary in Bukavu from 1981 until 1984. He then studied at the Novitiate of the White Fathers in Fribourg, Switzerland from 1984 until 1985. From 1985 to 1987, he completed a period of pastoral internship in the parish of Funsi, in the Roman Catholic Diocese of Wa, in Ghana. He studied Theology at The Missionary Institute London in England from 1987 until 1990. Later, he graduated with a Licentiate in Philosophy, from the Pontifical Gregorian University in Rome, Italy. Still later, the same university awarded him a Doctorate in the same subject.

== Priest ==
On 8 December 1989, he professed as a member of the White Fathers (Missionaries of Africa). He was ordained a priest of that Catholic religious order on 25 July 1990. He served as priest until 31 March 2015.

While a priest, he served in various roles and locations, including as:

- Parish Ministry in Funsi, in the Roman Catholic Diocese of Wa, in Ghana from 1990 until 1993.
- Studies for a Licentiate in Philosophy, in Rome at the Pontifical Gregorian University from 1993 until 1998.
- Lecturer and then rector of the Consortium of Philosophy in Jinja, Uganda from 1998 until 2004.
- Studies at the Pontifical Gregorian University, leading to the award of a Doctorate in Philosophy from 2004 until 2009.
- Professor of Philosophy at the Consortium of Philosophy in Kumasi, Ghana from 2009 until 2013.
- Professor of Philosophy at St. Augustin University, in Kinshasa from 2013 until 2014.
- Provincial Superior of the White Fathers for Central Africa from 2014 until 2015.

== As bishop ==
On 31 March 2015, Pope Francis appointed Reverend Jean-Christophore Amade Aloma, M.Afr., previously the Provincial Superior of the White Fathers for Central Africa as Bishop of the Roman Catholic Diocese of Kalemie-Kirungu, in the Democratic Republic of Congo. He was consecrated and installed at Kalemie, on 7 June 2015. The Principal Consecrator was Archbishop Jean-Pierre Tafunga Mbayo, Archbishop of Lubumbashi assisted by Archbishop François-Xavier Maroy Rusengo, Archbishop of Bukavu and Bishop Oscar Ngoy wa Mpanga, Bishop of Kongolo. He continues to administer the diocese as the Local Ordinary, as of June 2025.

== See also ==
- Catholic Church in the Democratic Republic of the Congo

== Succession table ==
Catholic Church titles
Preceded by Dominique Kimpinde Amando (31 March 1989 - 15 September 2010)	Bishop of Kalemie-Kirungu (since 31 March 2015)	Succeeded by Incumbent
