= Jean-Marie Vianney Musul Masas =

Congolese Catholic prelate (born 1974)

The Most Reverend Jean-Marie Vianney Musul Masas
- Auxiliary Bishop of Lubumbashi, Democratic Republic of the Congo
- Church: Catholic Church
- Archdiocese: Roman Catholic Archdiocese of Lubumbashi
- See: Lubumbashi
- Appointed: 15 April 2026

Orders
- Ordination: 25 July 2009
- Consecration: 2026 Expeccted
- Rank: Bishop

Personal details
- Born: Jean-Marie Vianney Musul Masas; 23 August 1974 (age 51) Fungurume, Archdiocese of Lubumbashi, Lualaba Province, DR Congo

Styles of Jean-Marie Vianney Musul Masas
- Reference style: Your Lordship; The Most Reverend
- Spoken style: His Lordship
- Religious style: Bishop

Jean-Marie Vianney Musul Masas (born 23 August 1974) is a Congolese Catholic prelate who was appointed Auxiliary Bishop of the Roman Catholic Archdiocese of Lubumbashi in the Democratic Republic of the Congo on 15 April 2026. Before that, from 25 July 2009 until 15 April 2026, he was a priest of the same Roman Catholic See. The bishop-elect was assigned the Titular See of Satafis. He was appointed bishop by Pope Leo XIV. His consecration is scheduled on a future date, to be comunicated later.

== Background and education ==
He was born on 23 August 1974 at Fungurume, Archdiocese of Lubumbashi, Lualaba Province, in the DR Congo. He studied at the Saint François Xavier de Sales Minor Seminary in Lubumbashi from 1988 until 1994. He studied at the University of Lubumbashi, graduating with a Master's degree in philosophy. He then studied theology at the Saint Paul Interdiocesan Major Seminary in Lubumbashi.

== Priest ==
He was ordained a priest on 25 July 2009 for the Archdiocese of Lubumbashi. He served as a priest until 15 April 2026. While a priest, he served in various roles and locations, including:

- Parish priest of Saint Augustin Parish in Lubumbashi from 2009 until 2011.
- Chaplain of the Pious Sisters Disciples of the Divine Master from 2011 until 2020.
- Chaplain of the Sisters of the Charité de Jésus et Marie in Lubumbashi from 2011 until 2020.
- Adjunct secretary-general of the Synod of the Diocese of Lubumbashi from 2011 until 2020.
- Parish administrator of Saint Jean Paul II Parish in 2012.
- Diocesan chancellor and master of ceremonies from 2011 until 2026.
- Sunday vicar at Notre Dame de la Paix in Lubumbashi from 2015 until 2026.

== Bishop ==
On 15 April 2026, Pope Leo XIV appointed Reverend Father Monsignor Jean-Marie Vianney Musul Masas, previously a member of the clergy of the same Metropolitan See as Auxiliary Bishop of the Metropolitan Province of Lubumbanshi, in the Democratic Republic of the Congo. He is expected to work with and assist Archbishop Fulgence Muteba Mugalu in administering to the faithful in the Catholic archdiocese. His episcopal consecration is scheduled on a future date, to be communicated later.

== See also ==
- Catholic Church in the Democratic Republic of the Congo

== Succession table ==
Catholic Church titles
Preceded by	Auxiliary Bishop of Lubumbashi (since 15 April 2026)	Succeeded by
