= Crauwels brothers =

- Louis and Gaston Crauwels
- Occupation: Spiritan missionaries
- Parents: Frans Crauwels; Bertha Hendrickx
- Relatives: Mieke Vogels (niece)
- Gaston Jan Crauwels
- Born: 29 August 1923; Walem, Belgium
- Died: 1 January 1962 (aged 38); Kongolo, Republic of the Congo (Léopoldville)
- Cause of death: Killed by radical African nationalists
- Education: Philosophy and theology, scholasticate of the Congregation of the Holy Spirit, Leuven
- Louis Crauwels
- Born: 23 December 1927; Walem, Belgium
- Died: 1 January 1962 (aged 34); Kongolo, Republic of the Congo (Léopoldville)
- Cause of death: Killed by radical African nationalists
- Education: Philosophy and theology, scholasticate of the Congregation of the Holy Spirit, Leuven

Gaston Crauwels, C.S.Sp. (1923–1962), and Louis Crauwels, C.S.Sp. (1927–1962), were Belgian missionaries of the Congregation of the Holy Spirit (Spiritans) who were killed together with seventeen other Belgian Spiritans and one Dutch brother by radical African nationalist elements of the national army Armée Nationale Congolaise on New Year's Day 1962, during the Kongolo Massacre. In 2019, the Diocese of Kongolo started the process of beatification of the twenty missionaries, including the Crauwels brothers.

== Early life ==
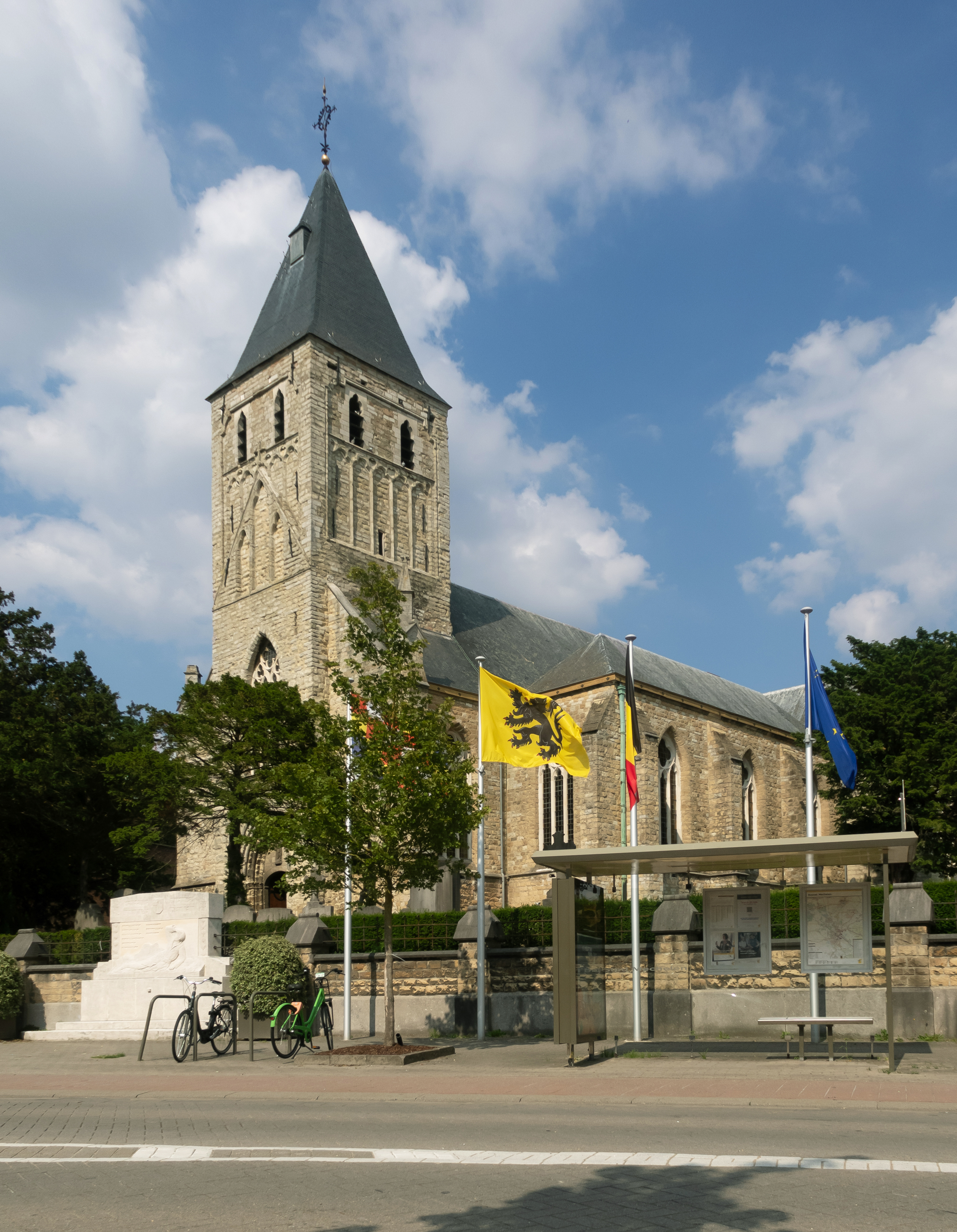
Parish church of Walem

Gaston and Louis Crauwels were two of ten children born to carpenter Frans Crauwels, and Bertha Hendrickx, in the village of Walem near Mechelen. They went to the missionary college of the Congregation of the Holy Spirit in Lier, Gaston from 1936 to 1945, and Louis from 1928 to 1948. Then, they went on noviciate in Cellule, France, before studying philosophy and theology at the scholasticate of the Congregation of the Holy Spirit in Leuven. Gaston was ordained as a priest on 8 July 1951; Louis followed on 11 July 1954.

== Missionary work in the Congo ==
In September 1952, Gaston left for the Belgian Congo to start his missionary work at the apostolic vicariate of Kongolo, first in Lubunda, then as the head of the new mission in Budi-Petshi in 1956, before moving to Ankoro in 1959. Louis left for the Belgian colony on 3 June 1956, where he became a teacher at the minor seminary of Kongolo, before becoming the director of the primary school and youth apostolate at the parish of the Immaculate Heart of Mary. In August 1960, the missionaries were chased out of Ankoro. Gaston was then appointed as the superior at the mission of Kongolo.

=== Kongolo massacre ===
Towards the end of 1961, troops of the armed forces of the secessionist State of Katanga conquered Kongolo. On 31 December, however, the Congolese army retook the city and imprisoned the missionaries in Kongolo's military camp. On New Year's Day, twenty missionaries were shot on the banks of the Lualaba River by elements of the Congolese army accusing them of working with the Katangese authorities, including the Crauwels brothers, Michel Vanduffel, and Theo Schildermans. Some Congolese seminarians had to dump the bodies in the river. The definitive responsibility for the massacre is still unclear. At first, Antoine Gizenga's cousin, general Victor Pakassa was accused of being implicated, but one of the surviving missionaries Jules Darmont exonerated him. Instead, the blame was put on wayward and intoxicated Balubakat Youth of Katanga (Jebakat) soldiers.

== Legacy ==
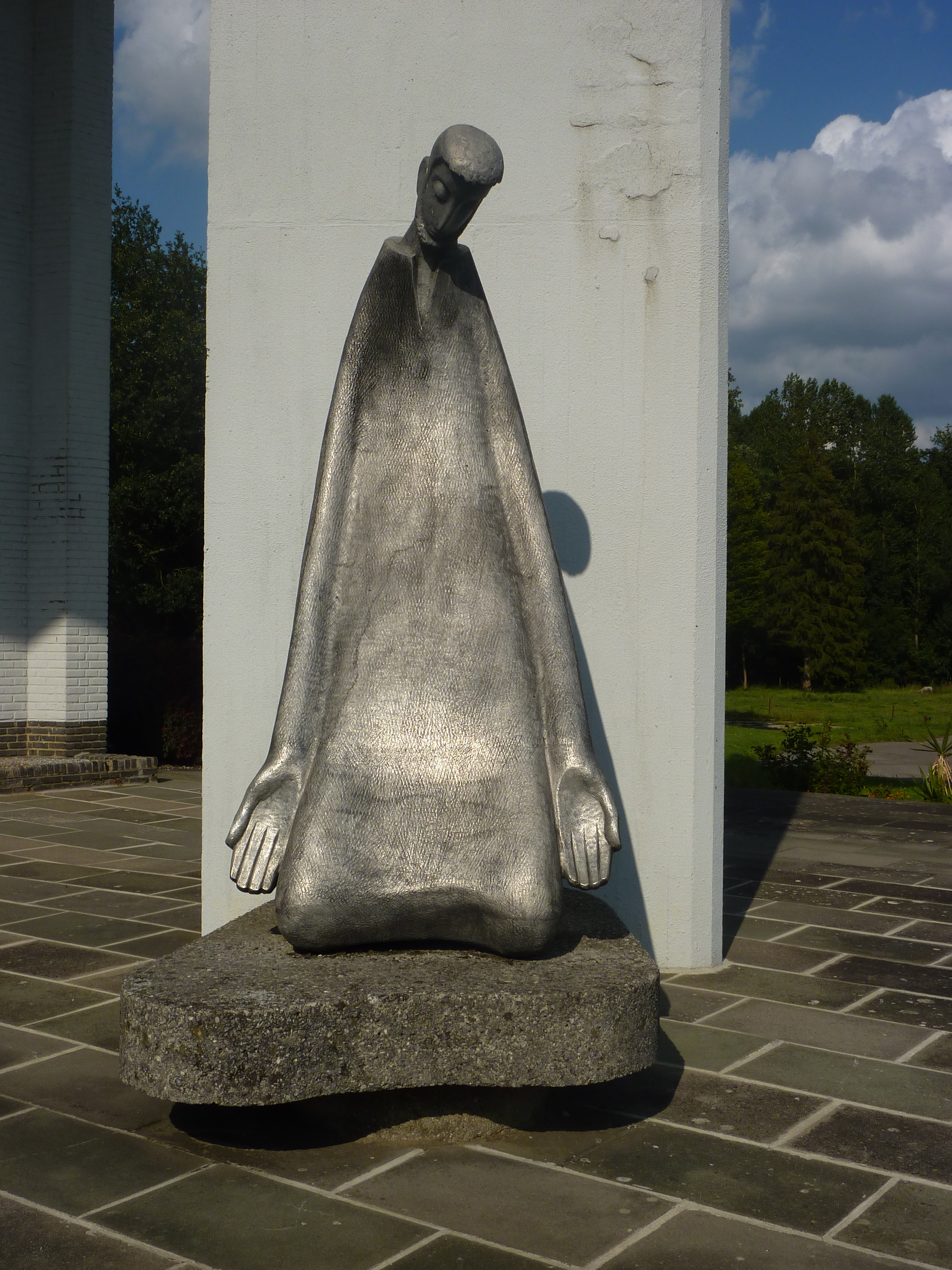
"The missionary offering his life", sculpture of Raf Mailleux at the Memorial Chapel of Kongolo in Gentinnes

- On 25 January 1962, cardinal Leo Joseph Suenens held a service at the Cathedral of St. Michael and St. Gudula in Brussels, commemorating the casualties of the Kongolo Massacre.
- On 1 January 1987, the twenty-fifth anniversary of the massacre, a memorial plaque was unveiled in the parish church of Walem.
- The twenty missionaries killed during the Kongolo Massacre became informally known as the 'Kongolo Martyrs'. Several monuments have been erected in memory of the missionaries, such as the Memorial Chapel of Kongolo in Gentinnes, Belgium. Memorials of the Kongolo Massacre in Belgium are more focused on the violence during the Congo Crisis, whereas memorials in Kongolo emphasise the missionaries' good works.
- Right after the deaths of the one Dutch and nineteen Belgian missionaries killed during the Kongolo Massacre, the Congregation of the Holy Spirit tried to start the beatification process. Under canon law, however, it was impossible to start the procedure since it was not clear whether they had been killed for their faith or not. In June 2019, bishop Oscar Ngoy wa Mpanga of the diocese of Kongolo announced the initiation of the beatification process of the one Dutch and nineteen Belgian missionaries killed during the Kongolo Massacre.
