= Diocese of Kilwa–Kasenga =

Roman Catholic diocese in the Democratic Republic of the Congo

Diocese of Kilwa–Kasenga Dioecesis Kilvaensis-Kasengaensis

Location
- Country: Democratic Republic of the Congo
- Metropolitan: Lubumbashi

Statistics
- Area: 54,000 km^{2} (21,000 sq mi)
- Population: Total; Catholics: (as of 2003); 450,000; 130,000 (28.9%)

Information
- Rite: Latin Rite

Current leadership
- Pope: Leo XIV
- Bishop: Désiré Lenge Mukwenye

The Roman Catholic Diocese of Kilwa–Kasenga (Latin: Kilvaën(sis) – Kasengaën(sis)) is a diocese located in the cities of Kilwa and Kasenga in the ecclesiastical province of Lubumbashi in the Democratic Republic of the Congo.

== History ==
- 8 July 1948: Established as Apostolic Prefecture of Lac Moero from the Apostolic Vicariate of Lulua and Central Katanga
- 24 August 1962: Promoted as Diocese of Kilwa
- 24 April 1971: Lost territory to establish Diocese of Manono
- 21 January 1977: Gained territory from Metropolitan Archdiocese of Lubumbashi
- 4 August 1977: Renamed as Diocese of Kilwa – Kasenga

== Leadership, in reverse chronological order ==
- Bishops of Kilwa–Kasenga (Latin Rite), below
  - Bishop Désiré Lenge Mukwenye (since 17 January 2024)
  - Bishop Fulgence Muteba Mugalu (18 March 2005 – 22 May 2021), appointed Archbishop of Lubumbashi
  - Bishop Jean-Pierre Tafunga Mbayo, S.D.B. (6 October 1992 – 10 June 2002), appointed Bishop of Uvira
  - Bishop Dominique Kimpinde Amando (28 March 1980 – 31 March 1989), appointed Bishop of Kalemie-Kirungu
  - Bishop André Ilunga Kaseba (4 August 1977 – 9 April 1979), appointed Bishop of Kalemie-Kirungu; see below
- Bishops of Kilwa (Latin Rite), below
  - Bishop André Ilunga Kaseba (19 December 1975 – 4 August 1977); see above
  - Bishop Joseph Alain Leroy, O.F.M. (24 August 1962 – 19 December 1975)
- Prefect Apostolic of Lac Moero (Latin Rite), below
  - Fr. Jean François Waterschoot, O.F.M. (19 November 1948 – 1962)

== See also ==
- Roman Catholicism in the Democratic Republic of the Congo

== Sources ==
- GCatholic.org
- Catholic Hierarchy
