= Oscar Ngoy wa Mpanga =

Congolese Catholic prelate (born 1964)

The Most Reverend Oscar Ngoy wa Mpanga
- Bishop of Kongolo, Democratic Republic of the Congo
- Church: Catholic Church
- Archdiocese: Roman Catholic Archdiocese of Lubumbashi
- See: Roman Catholic Diocese of Kongolo
- Appointed: 31 March 2007
- Installed: 9 June 2007
- Predecessor: Jérôme Nday Kanyangu Lukundwe
- Successor: Incumbent

Orders
- Ordination: 26 July 1992
- Consecration: 9 June 2007 by Jérôme Nday Kanyangu Lukundwe
- Rank: Bishop

Personal details
- Born: Oscar Ngoy wa Mpanga; 5 December 1964 (age 61) Kyolo, Diocese of Manono, Tanganyika Province, DR Congo
- Motto: "UT FRUCTUM AFFERATIS"
- Coat of arms

Styles of Oscar Ngoy wa Mpanga
- Reference style: Your Lordship; The Most Reverend
- Spoken style: His Lordship
- Religious style: Bishop

Oscar Ngoy wa Mpanga C.S.Sp. (born 5 December 1964) is a Congolese Catholic prelate who is the Bishop of the Roman Catholic Diocese of Kongolo in the Democratic Republic of the Congo since 31 March 2007. Before that, from 26 July 1992 until he was appointed bishop, he was a priest of the Order of the Congregation of the Holy Spirit. He was appointed bishop on 31 March 2007 by Pope Benedict XVI. He was consecrated as bishop at Kongolo on 9 June 2007.

== Background and education ==
He was born on 5 December 1964 Kyolo, Diocese of Manono, Tanganyika Province, DR Congo. He attended local schools for his elementary and secondary school education. He studied philosophy at the Jean XXIII Institute in Kolwezi from 1985 until 1987. He studied at the novitiate of the Congregation of the Holy Spirit from 1987 until 1988. He made his preliminary vows as a member of his religious Order in 1988. He then studied theology at the Poullartdes Places Institute, in Brazzaville, Republic of Congo from 1988 until 1992.

== Priest ==
On 26 July 1992 , he was ordained a priest of the Catholic Order of the Holy Ghost Fathers. He served as priest until 31 March 2007.

While a priest, he served in various roles including as:

- Animator at Katako Centre of Catechesis in the diocese of Kindu from 1992 until 1995.
- Rector of the CSSp Jacques-Désiré Laval College for Philosophy in Kinshasa from 1992 until 1998.
- Provincial superior of the Congregation of the Holy Spirit since 2000.
- Parish priest at Sainte Elisabeth parish in Lubumbashi since 2002.
- President of the assembly of Superiors major (ASUMA) of Katanga since 2005.

== Bishop ==
Pope Benedict XVI appointed him Bishop of Kongolo on 31 March 2007. He was consecrated and installed at Kongolo on 9 June 2007 by the hands of Bishop Jérôme Nday Kanyangu Lukundwe, Bishop Emeritus of Kongolo assisted by Archbishop Giovanni d'Aniello, Titular Archbishop of Pesto and Bishop Nestor Ngoy Katahwa Bishop of Kolwezi.

He succeeded Bishop Jérôme Nday Kanyangu Lukundwe, Bishop Emeritus of Kongolo, whose age-related retirement was accepted by the Holy See. Bishop Oscar Ngoy wa Mpanga is the Local Ordinary of the Diocese of Kongolo, as of September 2024.

== See also ==
- Catholic Church in the Democratic Republic of the Congo

== Succession table ==
Catholic Church titles
Preceded by Jérôme Nday Kanyangu Lukundwe (16 January 1971 - 31 March 2007)	Bishop of Kongolo (since 31 March 2007)	Succeeded by Incumbent
