= Diocese of Kolwezi =

Roman Catholic diocese in the Democratic Republic of the Congo

Diocese of Kolwezi Dioecesis Koluezensis

Location
- Country: Democratic Republic of the Congo
- Metropolitan: Lubumbashi

Statistics
- Area: 103,440 km^{2} (39,940 sq mi)
- Population: Total; Catholics: (as of 2003); 1,050,000; 615,000 (58.6%)

Information
- Rite: Latin Rite

Current leadership
- Pope: Leo XIV
- Bishop: Richard Kazadi Kamba
- Bishops emeritus: Nestor Ngoy Katahwa

The Roman Catholic Diocese of Kolwezi (Latin: Koluezen(sis)) is a diocese located in the city of Kolwezi in the ecclesiastical province of Lubumbashi in the Democratic Republic of the Congo.

== History ==
- 11 March 1971: Established as Diocese of Kolwezi from the Diocese of Kamina

== Leadership ==
- Bishops of Kolwezi (Latin Rite), in reverse chronological order
  - Bishop Richard Kazadi Kamba (since 11 January 2022)
  - Bishop Nestor Ngoy Katahwa (16 November 2000 – 11 January 2022)
  - Bishop Floribert Songasonga Mwitwa (25 April 1974 – 22 May 1998), appointed Archbishop of Lubumbashi
  - Bishop Victor Petrus Keuppens, O.F.M. (11 March 1971 – 25 April 1974)

== See also ==
- Roman Catholicism in the Democratic Republic of the Congo

== Sources ==
- GCatholic.org
- Catholic Hierarchy
