= Auguste-Léopold Huys =

Mgr. Auguste-Léopold Huys
- Coadjutor Vicar Apostolic of Upper Congo
- Installed: 16 March 1909
- Term ended: 8 October 1938
- Other post: Titular Bishop of Rusicade (16 March 1909 – 8 October 1938)

Orders
- Ordination: 21 September 1895
- Consecration: 16 March 1909 by Cardinal Désiré-Joseph Mercier

Personal details
- Born: 9 July 1871 Bruges, Belgium
- Died: 8 October 1938 (aged 67)

Auguste-Léopold Huys (9 July 1871 – 8 October 1938) was a Catholic White Fathers missionary who was Coadjutor Vicar Apostolic of Upper Congo in the east of today's Democratic Republic of the Congo from 1909 until his death in 1938.

== Life ==
Auguste-Léopold Huys was born on 9 July 1871 in Bruges, Belgium. On 21 September 1895 he was ordained a priest of the White Fathers (Society of Missionaries of Africa). On 26 August 1897, Huys arrived at the mission station of Mpala, on the west shore of Lake Tanganyika. After a few months he was made director of the catechist school. He founded the first junior seminary in the Congo. After the summer holidays of 1898, with the authority of the Vicar-General Mgr. Victor Roelens, he brought all the most pious and best behaved pupils to Mpala and began to teach them the elements of Latin grammar.

On 16 March 1909, Huys was appointed Titular Bishop of Rusicade and Coadjutor Vicar Apostolic of Upper Congo, assisting Bishop Roelens. He was ordained Titular Bishop of Rusicade by Cardinal Désiré-Joseph Mercier on 12 April 1909.

== Death ==
He died on 8 October 1938.
