= Mwitwa =

Mwitwa is a surname. Notable people with the surname include:

- Floribert Songasonga Mwitwa (1937–2020), Congolese archbishop
- Timothy Mwitwa (1968–1993), Zambian footballer
