= Diocese of Kongolo =

Roman Catholic diocese in the Democratic Republic of the Congo

Coordinates: 5.38°S 26.99°E

Diocese of Kongolo Dioecesis Kongoloensis

Location
- Country: Democratic Republic of the Congo
- Metropolitan: Lubumbashi

Statistics
- Area: 44,206 km^{2} (17,068 sq mi)
- Population: Total; Catholics: (as of 2004); 700,000; 135,350 (19.3%)

Information
- Rite: Latin Rite

Current leadership
- Pope: Leo XIV
- Bishop: Oscar Ngoy wa Mpanga

The Roman Catholic Diocese of Kongolo (Latin: Kongoloën(sis)) is a Latin suffragan diocese in the ecclesiastical province of Lubumbashi in the Democratic Republic of the Congo.

Its cathedral episcopal see is Cathédrale Sacré-Coeur-de-Marie (dedicated to Our Lady's Heart) in the city of Kongolo.

== History ==
- Established on 30 June 1911 as Apostolic Prefecture of Northern Katanga, on territory split off from the then Apostolic Vicariate of Léopoldville
- Promoted on 18 June 1935 as Apostolic Vicariate of Northern Katanga, hence entitled to a titular bishop
- Renamed 8 March 1951 as Apostolic Vicariate of Kongolo, after its see
- Lost territory on 23 April 1956 to establish the then Apostolic Vicariate of Kindu
- Promoted on 10 November 1959 as Diocese of Kongolo, no longer missionary nor exempt
- Lost territory on 10 March 1966 to the Diocese of Kabinda
- Gained territory on 8 May 1971 from the Diocese of Baudouinville (now Kalemie–Kirungu)
- Lost territory on 31 May 1971 to establish the Diocese of Manono

== Bishops ==
(all Roman rite)

=== Ordinaries ===
(So far all but one are members of the Holy Ghost Fathers (C.S.Sp.).)

==== Apostolic Prefects of Northern Katanga ====
- Fr. Emilio Callewaert, C.S.Sp. (1912 – 1922)
- Fr. Luigi Lempereur, C.S.Sp. (1922 – 1930)
- Fr. Giorgio Giuseppe Haezaert, C.S.Sp. (19 February 1931 – 18 June 1935 see below)

==== Apostolic Vicars of Northern Katanga ====
- Bishop Giorgio Giuseppe Haezaert, C.S.Sp. (see above 18 June 1935 – 1949), Titular Bishop of Pertusa (18 June 1935 – 29 September 1957)
- Bishop Gustave Joseph Bouve, C.S.Sp. (31 May 1950 – 8 March 1951 see below), Titular Bishop of Cremna (31 May 1950 – 10 November 1959)

==== Apostolic Vicars of Kongolo ====
- Bishop Gustave Joseph Bouve, C.S.Sp. (see above 8 March 1951 – 10 November 1959 see below)

==== Bishops of Kongolo ====
- Bishop Gustave Joseph Bouve, C.S.Sp. (see above 10 November 1959 – 1 September 1970), afterward Titular Bishop of Zama minor (1 September 1970 – 4 March 1971)
- Bishop Jérôme Nday Kanyangu Lukundwe (16 January 1971 – 31 March 2007)
- Bishop Oscar Ngoy wa Mpanga, (C.S.Sp.) (31 March 2007 - ...), also Apostolic Administrator of Kalemie–Kirungu (Congo-Kinshasa) (15 September 2010 – 31 March 2015)

=== Other priests of this diocese who became bishops ===
- Vincent de Paul Kwanga Njubu, appointed Bishop of Manono in 2005
- Fulgence Muteba Mugalu, appointed Bishop of Kilwa-Kasenga in 2005

== See also ==
- Roman Catholicism in the Democratic Republic of the Congo

== Sources and external links ==
- GCatholic.org, with incumbent biography links
- Catholic Hierarchy
