= Vincent de Paul Kwanga Njubu =

Congolese Catholic prelate (born 1956)

The Most Reverend Vincent de Paul Kwanga Njubu
- Bishop of Manono, Democratic Republic of the Congo
- Church: Catholic Church
- Archdiocese: Roman Catholic Archdiocese of Lubumbashi
- See: Roman Catholic Diocese of Manono
- Appointed: 18 March 2005
- Installed: 18 June 2005
- Predecessor: Nestor Ngoy Katahwa
- Successor: Incumbent

Orders
- Ordination: 31 August 1985 by Jérôme Nday Kanyangu Lukundwe
- Consecration: 18 June 2005 by Jérôme Nday Kanyangu Lukundwe
- Rank: Bishop

Personal details
- Born: Vincent de Paul Kwanga Njubu; 24 January 1956 (age 70) Budi, Diocese of Kongolo, Tanganyika Province, DR Congo

Styles of Vincent de Paul Kwanga Njubu
- Reference style: Your Lordship; The Most Reverend
- Spoken style: His Lordship
- Religious style: Bishop

Vincent de Paul Kwanga Njubu (born 24 January 1956) is a Congolese Catholic prelate who is the Bishop of the Roman Catholic Diocese of Manono in the Democratic Republic of the Congo since 18 March 2005. Before that, from 31 August 1985 until he was appointed bishop, he was a priest of the Roman Catholic Diocese of Kongolo. He was appointed bishop on 18 March 2005 by Pope John Paul II. He was consecrated as bishop at Manono on 18 June 2005.

== Background and education ==
He was born on 24 January 1956 in Budi, Diocese of Kongolo, Tanganyika Province, DR Congo. He attended local schools for his elementary and secondary school education. He studied philosophy and theology at seminaries in the Democratic Republic of the Congo. He graduated with an advanced degree in Canon Law from the Pontifical Gregorian University in Rome, Italy.

== Priest ==
On 31 Aug 1985, he was ordained a priest of the Catholic Diocese of Kongolo. He served as priest until 18 March 2005.

While a priest, he served in various roles including as:

- Assistant priest.
- Parish priest.
- Judicial Vicar.
- Diocesan chancellor.
- Teacher of Canon Law at St. Paul's Seminary Lubumbashi.
- National director of the Pontifical Mission Societies with offices in Kinshasa from 2002 until 2005.

== Bishop ==
Pope John Paul II appointed him Bishop of Manono on 18 March 2005. He was consecrated and installed at Manono on 18 June 2005 by the hands of Bishop Jérôme Nday Kanyangu Lukundwe, Bishop of Kongolo assisted by Archbishop Giovanni d'Aniello, Titular Archbishop of Pesto and Bishop Jean-Anatole Kalala Kaseba, Bishop of Kamina. As of September 2024, he was the Local Ordinary of the Diocese of Manono, in the Democratic Republic of the Congo.

== See also ==
- Catholic Church in the Democratic Republic of the Congo

== Succession table ==
Catholic Church titles
Preceded by Nestor Ngoy Katahwa (25 September 1989 - 16 November 2000)	Bishop of Manono (since 18 March 2005)	Succeeded by Incumbent
