= Richard Kazadi Kamba =

Congolese Catholic prelate (born 1964)

The Most Reverend Richard Kazadi Kamba
- Bishop of Kolwezi, Democratic Republic of the Congo
- Church: Catholic Church
- Archdiocese: Roman Catholic Archdiocese of Lubumbashi
- See: Roman Catholic Diocese of Kolwezi
- Appointed: 11 January 2022
- Installed: 7 May 2022
- Predecessor: Nestor Ngoy Katahwa
- Successor: Incumbent

Orders
- Ordination: 19 September 1992
- Consecration: 7 May 2022 by Tharcisse Tshibangu Tshishiku
- Rank: Bishop

Personal details
- Born: Richard Kazadi Kamba; 6 December 1964 (age 61) Lubumbashi, Archdiocese of Lubumbashi, Haut-Katanga Province, DR Congo

Styles of Richard Kazadi Kamba
- Reference style: Your Lordship; The Most Reverend
- Spoken style: His Lordship
- Religious style: Bishop

Richard Kazadi Kamba (born 6 December 1964) is a Congolese Catholic prelate who is the Bishop of the Roman Catholic Diocese of Kolwezi in the Democratic Republic of the Congo since 11 January 2022. Before that, from 19 September 1992 until he was appointed bishop, he was a priest of the Roman Catholic archdiocese of Lubumbashi in the DR Congo. He was appointed bishop on 11 January 2022 by Pope Francis. He was consecrated as bishop at Kolwezi on 7 May 2022.

== Background and education ==
He was born on 6 December 1964 in Lubumbashi. He studied at the Saint Paul Preparatory Seminary in Lubumbashi from 1985 until 1986. He studied philosophy at the same seminary from 1986 until 1989. He then studied theology at the Catholic University of Kinshasa (CUK), from 1989 until 1992. He continued with his studies at the CUK from 1992 until 1994, graduating with a Licentiate in theology from there in 1994. Later, he was awarded a licentiate in philosophy by the Jean XXIII Seminary in Kinshasa, after studying there from 1996 until 1998. He also holds a Doctorate in dogmatic theology from the Pontifical Gregorian University, in Rome, Italy, where he studied from 1998 until 2003.

== Priest ==
On 25 March 1992, he was ordained a deacon of Lubumbashi, Democratic Republic of the Congo by Bishop Tharcisse Tshibangu Tshishiku, Bishop of Mbujimayi. He was ordained a priest of the Archdiocese of Lubumbashi on 19 September 1992 by Archbishop Eugène Kabanga Songasonga, Archbishop of Lubumbashi. He served as a priest until 11 January 2022.

While a priest, he served in various roles including as:

- Parish vicar of Saint Pierre Parish.
- Notary of the ecclesiastical tribunal of Lubumbashi.
- Lecturer in theology at the Saint Paul Seminary.
- Vicar of the Saints Pierre et Paul Cathedral from 1994 until 1995.
- Sunday vicar of Muzeyi and chaplain of the Saint Pierre residence for the elderly in Kinshasa from 1995 until 1998.
- Lecturer in theology of catechesis at the Jean XXIII Seminary in Kinshasa from 1996 until 1998.
- Parish vicar of Santo Stefano in Viterbo from 2000 until 2007.
- Visiting professor in the Faculty of Theology of the Jesuits in Abidjan from 2008 until 2009.
- Lecturer in theology, philosophy and social communications at the Saint Paul Major Seminary in Lubumbashi.
- Vice-rector of Saint Paul Major Seminary in Lubumbashi from 2008 until 2010.
- Secretary and spokesperson of the Provincial Episcopal Assembly of Lubumbashi from 2010 until 2011.
- Director general of the Institut Supèrieur Interdiocésain Monseigneur Mololwa from 2010 until 2011.
- Director of the Interdiocesan Centre of Lubumbashi from 2010 until 2011.
- President of the Preparatory Commission for the Second Diocesan Synod of Lubumbashi from 2010 until 2012.
- President of the Commission for the Implementation of the same Synod from 2012.
- Technical secretary of the preparatory committee for the Third National Eucharistic Congress of Lubumbashi since 2019.

== Bishop ==
Pope Francis appointed him Bishop of Kolwezi on 11 January 2022. He was consecrated and installed at Kolwezi on 7 May 2022 by the hands of Archbishop Ettore Balestrero, Titular Archbishop of Victoriana assisted by Archbishop Fulgence Muteba Mugalu, Archbishop of Lubumbashi and Bishop Nestor Ngoy Katahwa, Bishop Emeritus of Kolwezi.

He succeeded Bishop Nestor Ngoy Katahwa, Bishop Emeritus of Kolwezi, whose age-related retirement was accepted by the Holy See.

== See also ==
- Catholic Church in the Democratic Republic of the Congo

== Succession table ==
Catholic Church titles
Preceded by Nestor Ngoy Katahwa (16 November 2000 Appointed - 11 January 2022)	Bishop of Kolwezi (since 11 January 2022)	Succeeded by Incumbent
