= Gaston Kashala Ruwezi =

Congolese Catholic prelate (born in 1961)

The Most Reverend Gaston Kashala Ruwezi
- Bishop of Sakania-Kipushi, Democratic Republic of the Congo
- Church: Catholic Church
- Archdiocese: Roman Catholic Archdiocese of Lubumbashi
- See: Roman Catholic Diocese of Sakania-Kipushi
- Appointed: 7 April 2004
- Installed: 14 August 2004
- Predecessor: Elie Amsini Kiswaya
- Successor: Incumbent

Orders
- Ordination: 14 July 1990
- Consecration: 14 August 2004 by Floribert Songasonga Mwitwa
- Rank: Bishop

Personal details
- Born: Gaston Kashala Ruwezi; 14 April 1961 (age 64); Lubumbashi, Archdiocese of Lubumbashi, Haut-Katanga Province, DR Congo

Styles of Gaston Kashala Ruwezi
- Reference style: Your Lordship; The Most Reverend
- Spoken style: His Lordship
- Religious style: Archbishop

Gaston Kashala Ruwezi S.D.B. (born 14 April 1961) is a Congolese Catholic prelate who serves as Bishop of the Roman Catholic Diocese of Sakania-Kipushi, in the Democratic Republic of the Congo, since 7 April 2004. Before that, from 14 July 1990 until he was appointed bishop, he was a priest of the Roman Catholic Order of the Salesians of Saint John Bosco. He was appointed bishop on 7 April 2004 by Pope John Paul II. He was consecrated and installed at Kipushi, on 14 August 2004.

== Background and education ==
He was born on 14 April 1961 at Lubumbashi. He studied in the DR Congo, Rwanda and Italy. In Italy, he started out in Turin and then transferred to Rome. He graduated with a Licentiate in Sacred Scripture at the Pontifical Biblical Institute.

== Priest ==
He was ordained a priest of the Order of Society of Saint Francis de Sales on 14 July 1990. He served as priest until 7 April 2004.

While a priest, he served in various roles and locations including as:

- Professor of exegesis at the St. Paul College of Theology at Lubumbashi.
- Director of the College community and Councilor and vicar of the Salesian Inspectorate for Central Africa.

== As bishop ==
On 7 April 2004, Pope John Paul II appointed him as bishop of the Roman Catholic Diocese of Sakania-Kipushi, DRC. He was consecrated and installed at Kipushi, on 14 August 2004 by the hands of Archbishop Floribert Songasonga Mwitwa, Archbishop of Lubumbashi assisted by Archbishop Giovanni d'Aniello, Titular Archbishop of Pesto and Bishop Jean-Pierre Tafunga Mbayo, Bishop of Uvira. As of May 2025, Bishop Gaston Kashala Ruwezi was the Local Ordinary of the Catholic Diocese of Sakania-Kipushi in the Democratic Republic of the Congo.

== See also ==
- Catholic Church in the Democratic Republic of the Congo

== Succession table ==
Catholic Church titles
Preceded by Elie Amsini Kiswaya (20 November 1975 - 21 December 2001)	Bishop of Sakania-Kipushi (since 7 April 2004)	Succeeded by Incumbent
