= Diocese of Sakania–Kipushi =

Roman Catholic diocese in the Democratic Republic of the Congo

Diocese of Sakania–Kipushi Dioecesis Sakaniensis-Kipushiensis

Location
- Country: Democratic Republic of the Congo
- Metropolitan: Lubumbashi

Statistics
- Area: 40,000 km^{2} (15,000 sq mi)
- Population: Total; Catholics: (as of 2004); 203,995; 109,975 (53.9%)

Information
- Rite: Latin Rite

Current leadership
- Pope: Leo XIV
- Bishop: Gaston Kashala Ruwezi, S.D.B.

The Roman Catholic Diocese of Sakania–Kipushi (Latin: Sakanien(sis) – Kipushien(sis)) is a diocese located in the city of Sakania–Kipushi in the ecclesiastical province of Lubumbashi in the Democratic Republic of the Congo.

== History ==
- 12 May 1925: Established as Apostolic Prefecture of Upper Luapula from the Apostolic Prefecture of Katanga
- 14 November 1939: Promoted as Apostolic Vicariate of Sakania
- 10 November 1959: Promoted as Diocese of Sakania
- 13 November 1976: Gained territory from Archdiocese of Lubumbashi
- 5 March 1977: Renamed as Diocese of Sakania – Kipushi

== Leadership, in reverse chronological order ==
- Bishops of Sakania–Kipushi (Latin Rite), below
  - Bishop Gaston Kashala Ruwezi, S.D.B. (since 7 April 2004)
  - Bishop Elie Amsini Kiswaya (5 March 1977 – 21 December 2001); see below
- Bishops of Sakania (Latin rite), below
  - Bishop Elie Amsini Kiswaya (20 November 1975 – 5 March 1977); see above
  - Bishop Petrus Frans Lehaen, S.D.B. (10 November 1959 – 15 June 1973); see below
- Vicars Apostolic of Sakania (Latin rite)
  - Bishop Petrus Frans Lehaen, S.D.B. (12 February 1959 – 10 November 1959); see above
  - Bishop René van Heusden, S.D.B. (13 February 1947 – 22 March 1958)
  - Bishop Jose Sak, S.D.B. (14 November 1939 – 15 March 1946); see below
- Prefect Apostolic of Upper Luapula (Latin rite)
  - Father Jose Sak, S.D.B. (14 July 1925 – 14 November 1939); see above

== See also ==
- Roman Catholicism in the Democratic Republic of the Congo

== Sources ==
- GCatholic.org
- Catholic Hierarchy
