= Ardooie =

- Municipality
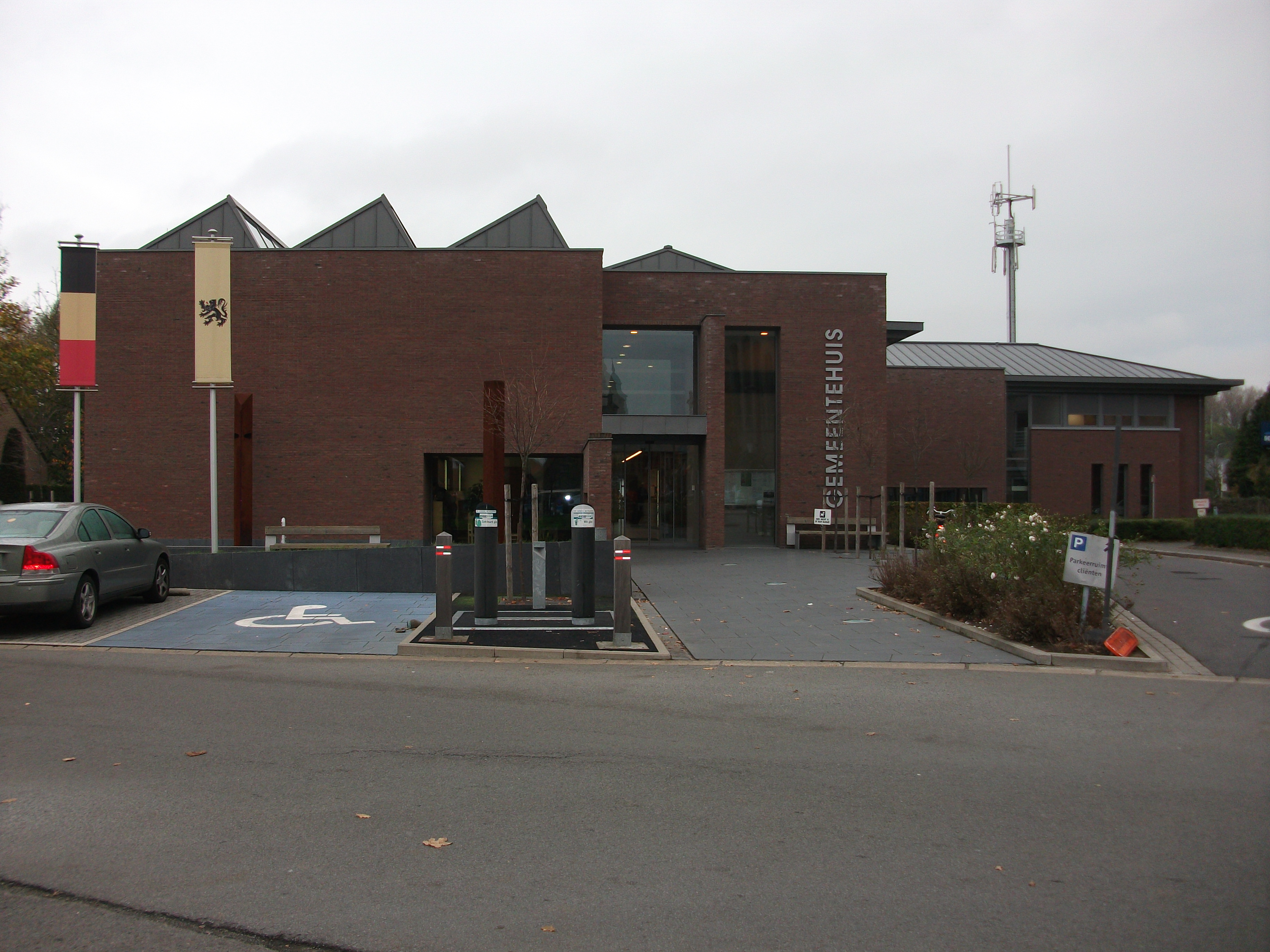
- Ardooie town hall

- Flag Coat of arms

- Location of Ardooie in West Flanders
- Interactive map of Ardooie
- Location in Belgium
- Coordinates: 50°58′N 03°11′E
- Country: Belgium
- Community: Flemish Community
- Region: Flemish Region
- Province: West Flanders
- Arrondissement: Tielt

Government
  - Mayor: Véronique Buyck (Groep 82)
  - Governing party: Groep 82

Area
  - Total: 34.92 km^{2} (13.48 sq mi)

Population (2018-01-01)
  - Total: 8,988
  - Density: 257.4/km^{2} (666.6/sq mi)
- Postal codes: 8850, 8851
- NIS code: 37020
- Area codes: 051
- Website: www.ardooie.be

Ardooie (Dutch pronunciation: [ˈɑrdoːi.ə]; West Flemish: Ardôoie) is a municipality in the Belgian province of West Flanders. The municipality comprises the towns of Ardooie proper and Koolskamp. In 2006 Ardooie had a total population of 9,147. The local inhabitants are called Ardooienaren. During the First World War Hitler was stationed in Ardooie quartered with a family. He painted some of the buildings and the countryside.

== Sights ==
- St. Martin's Church (Sint-Martinuskerk) with a Gothic tower, listed since 1939 as part of the national monumental heritage;
- the mansion de Mûelenaere, today a library;
- Ardooie Castle, also known as the De Jonghe d'Ardoye Castle (Dutch: Kasteel van Ardooie or Kasteel De Jonghe d'Ardoye): this Neo-Classical country house was built at the end of the 18th century by the local landowners, the Van Ardooie family, who also called themselves as D'Ardoye. It became a protected historical monument in 1984, housing a communication agency since 2007. The building and most of the grounds remain private property.
- a brewery-complex from the 19th century;
- the Rysselende Mill, constructed in 1855.
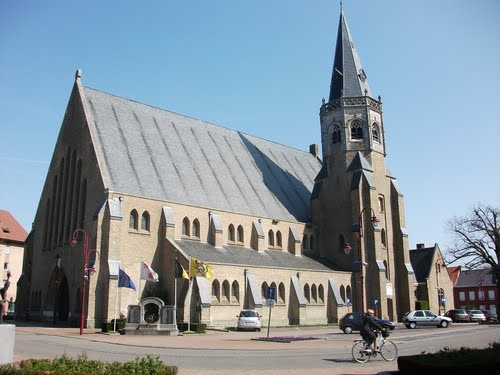
St. Martin's Church

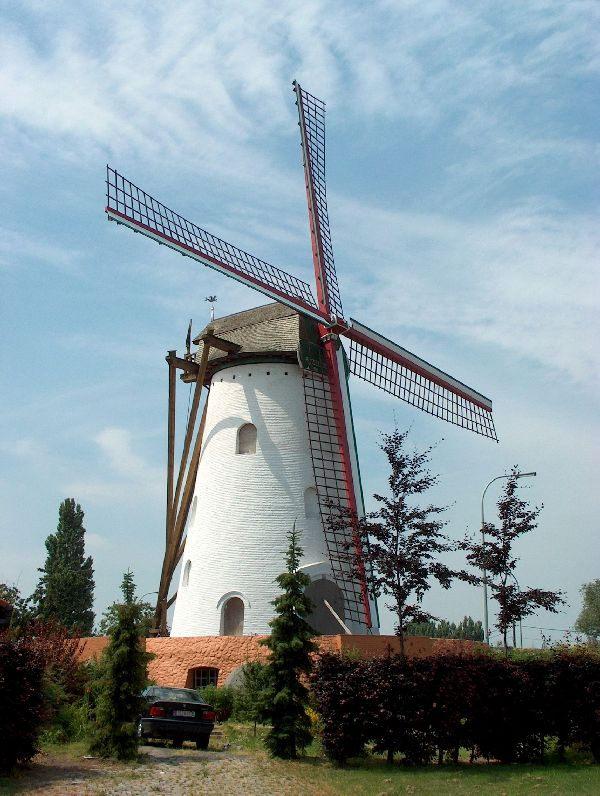
Rysselende Mill

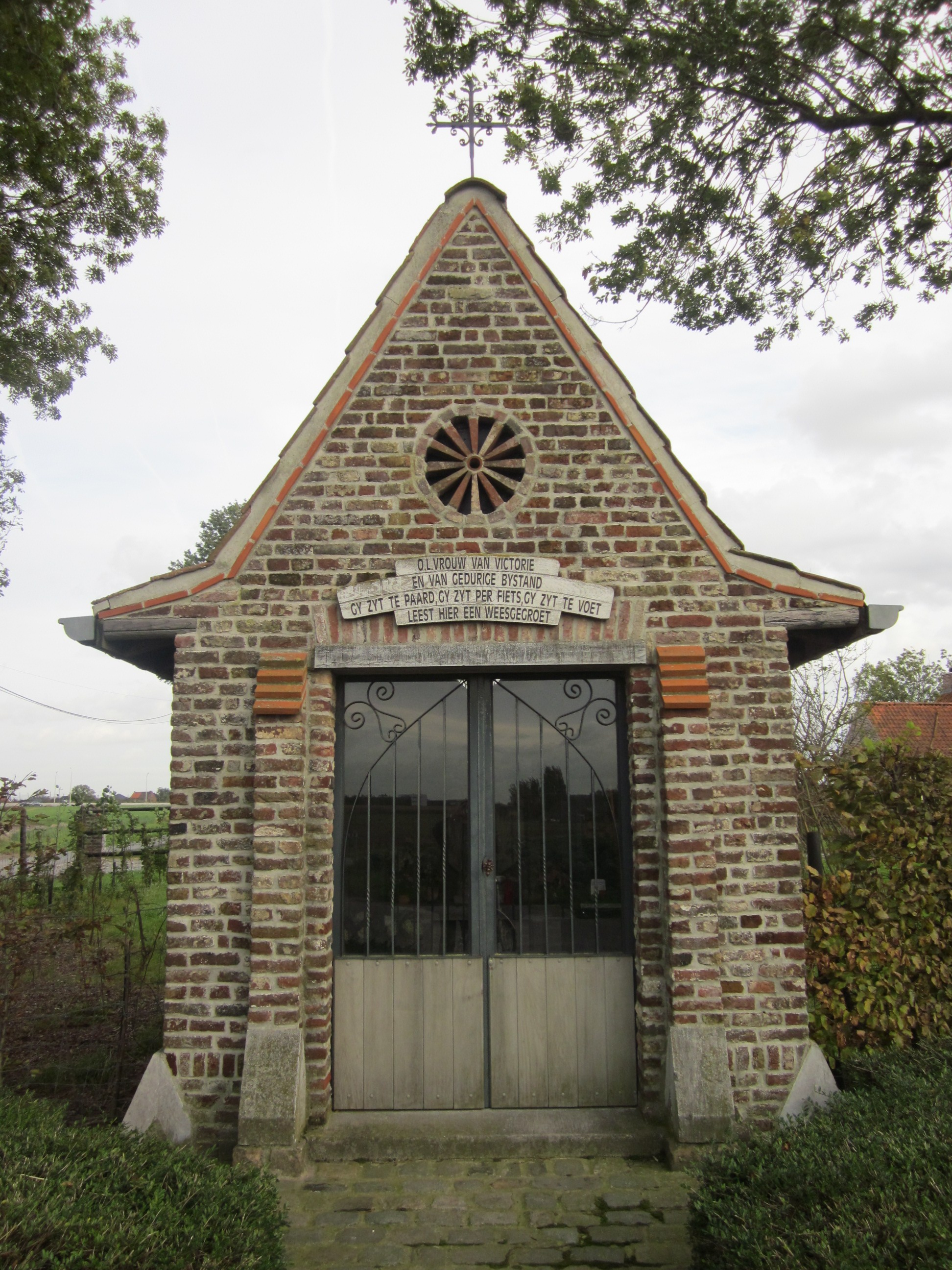
Onze-Lieve-Vrouwekapel

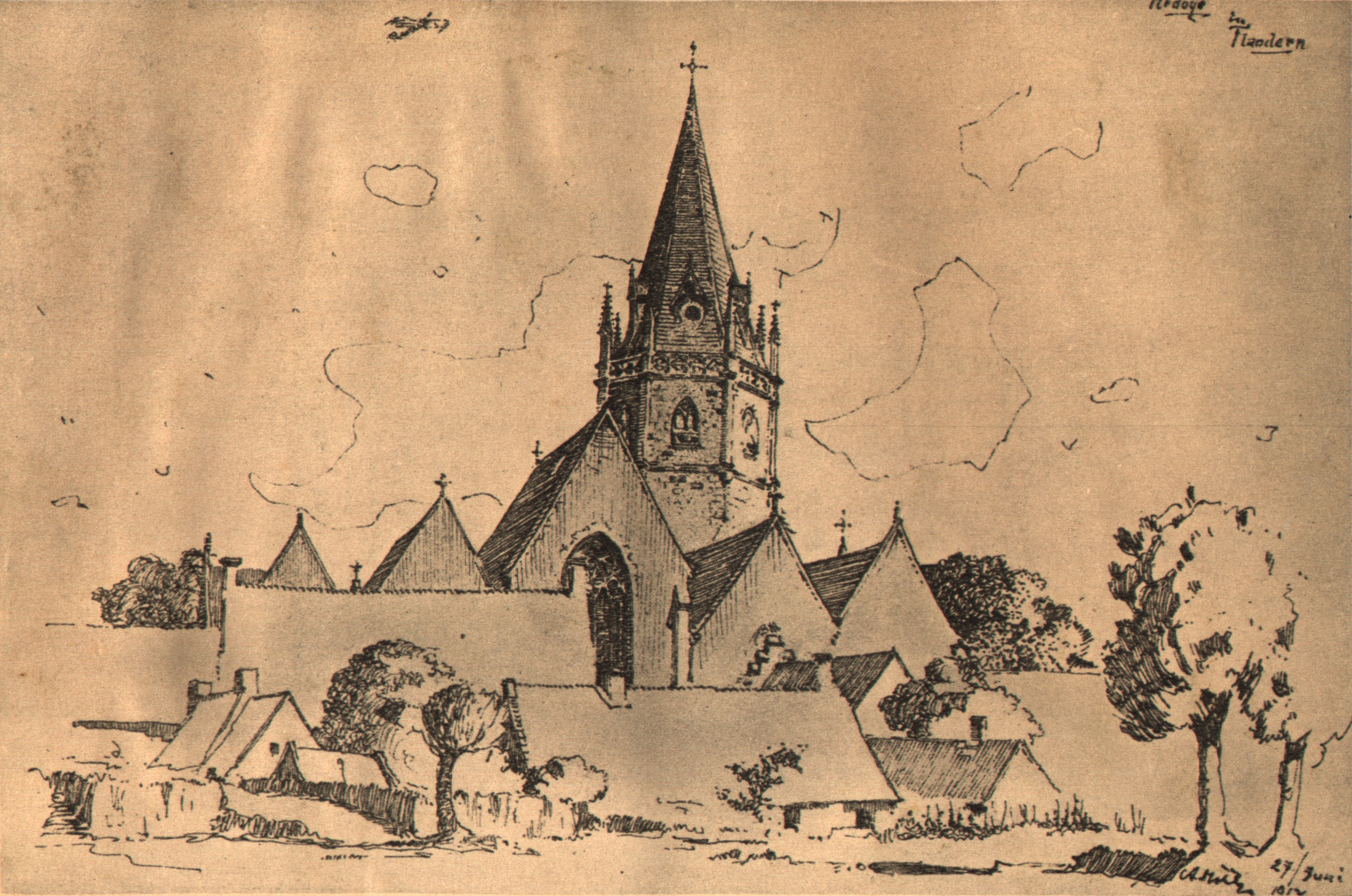
Sketch of Ardooie church, 1917, by Adolf Hitler

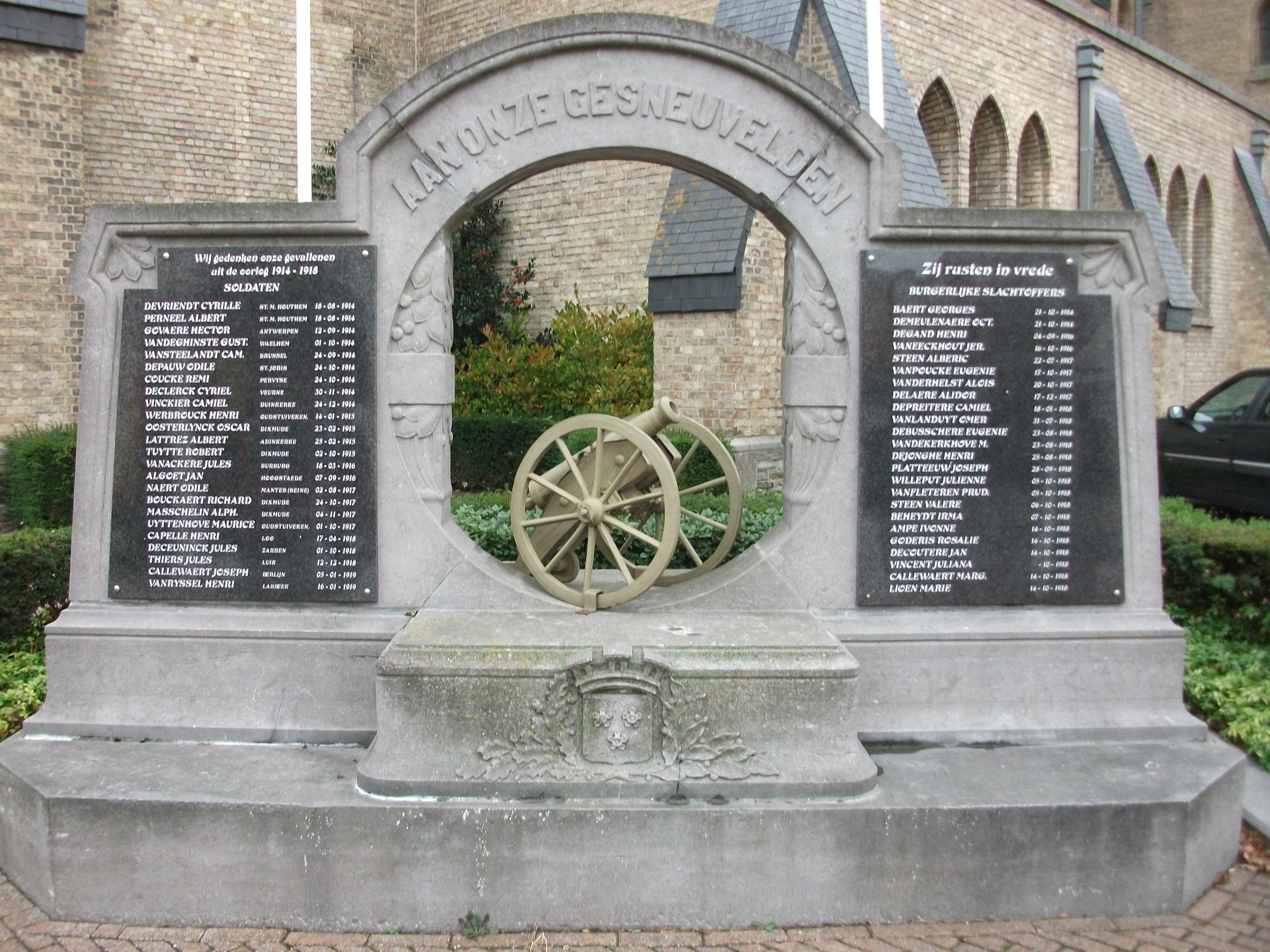
Monument for the victims (civil and soldiers) of World War I from Ardooie

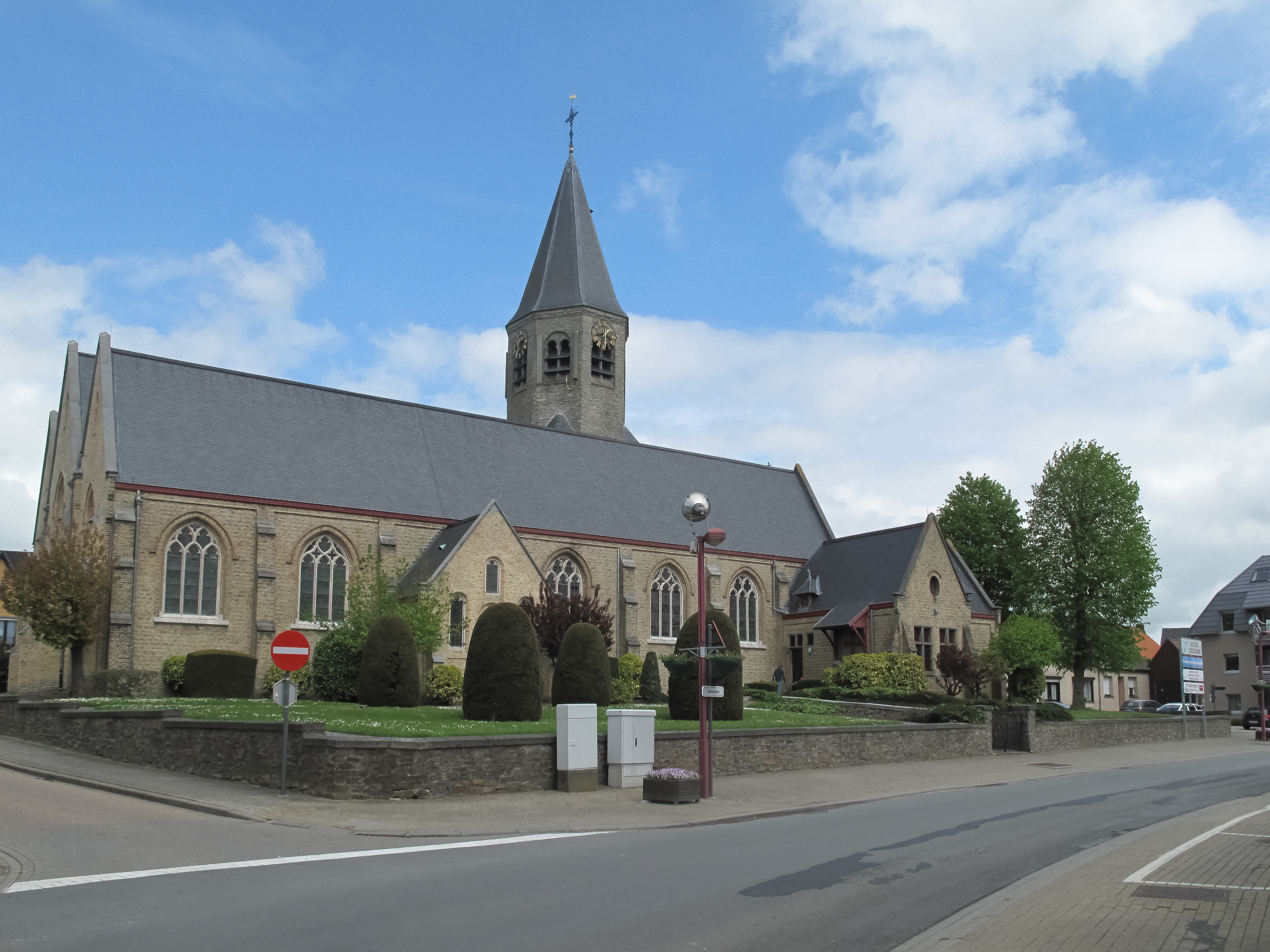
Church: parochiekerk Sint Martinus in Koolskamp

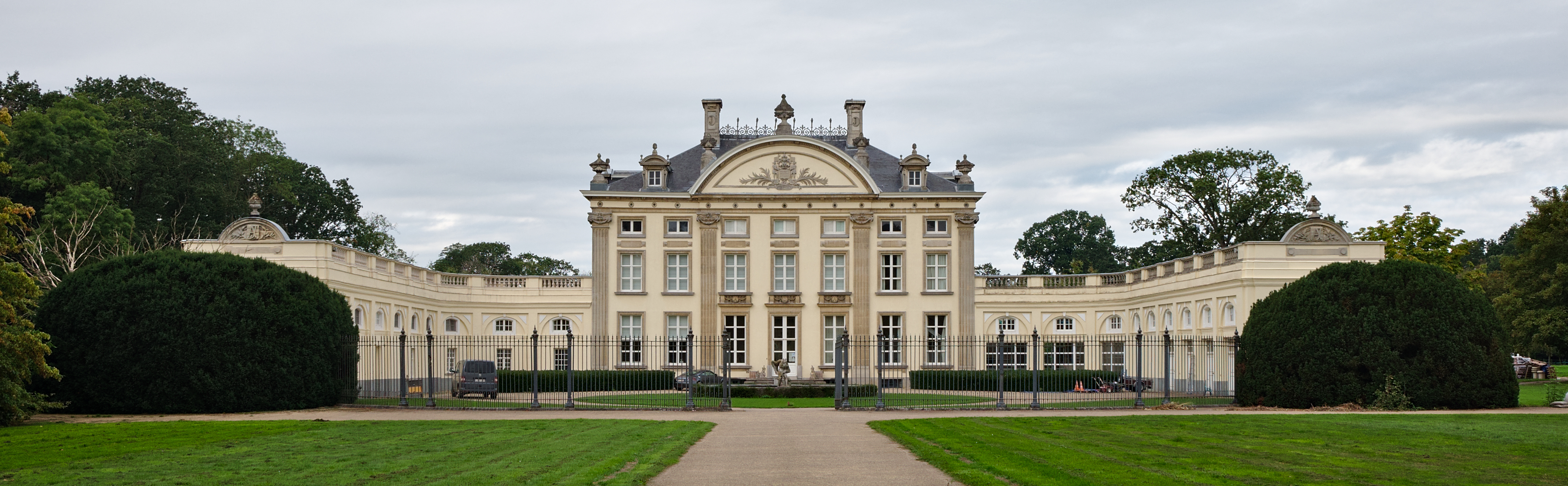
Ardooie Castle

== Hamlets ==
Ardooie and neighbouring municipalities. The yellow zones are urban areas.

Next to Ardooie itself is the part-municipality Koolskamp. Part of Ardooie is also the hamlet De Tassche, about two kilometers west from the centre of Ardooie, on the border with the city of Roeselare. In the east on the border with the neighbouring municipality Meulebeke, part of the hamlet 't Veld, also called de Sneppe, is situated in Ardooie.

#	Name	Area	Population (2005)
I (III) (IV)	Ardooie: Ardooie; Tasse; Sneppe	24.14	6.882
II	Koolskamp	10.43	2.265

Ardooie is adjacent to the following villages:

- a. Lichtervelde (Lichtervelde municipality)
- b. Zwevezele (Wingene municipality)
- c. Egem (Pittem municipality)
- d. Pittem (Pittem municipality)
- e. Meulebeke (Meulebeke municipality)
- f. Emelgem (Izegem city)
- g. Kachtem (Izegem city)
- h. Roeselare (Roeselare city)
- i. Beveren (Roeselare city)

== Accessibility ==
- The motorway E403 runs through the west of the village and has two exits, one for Ardooie itself (exit 8) and one for the part-municipality Koolskamp (exit 9). On the other side of the village runs the N50 district road from Bruges to Kortrijk (the Rysselende Mill is built by this road).

Ardooie is separated from Koolskamp by the railway line Adinkerke-Ghent. Until the mid-1980s years Ardooie had two NMBS- railway stations: one in the north of the main village and one on the quarter "De Kortekeer".

== Industry ==
Although the village is quite small, many companies have their head-office here. It is best known for its frozen vegetables factories, seven in total, the highest number for a single municipality in Europe.

The major companies in Ardooie are:

- Afschrift, industrial electricity and automation
- Ardicor, inhouse (de)construction
- Ardo (formerly Ardovries), frozen foods
- Ardovlam, protection against fire and burglary in buildings
- d'Arta, frozen vegetables
- Danis, in Koolskamp, producer of animal foods and specialising in construction of pig-sties
- Devriese, road construction
- DeZetel, furniture
- Dicogel-Begro, frozen vegetables
- Haco (earlier: Kimac), manufacturer of woodworking machines
- Homifreez, frozen vegetables
- Louage & Wisselinck, construction of doors and furniture
- Metafox, furniture
- OVA, manufacturer of industrial vehicles
- Polaris Creative Solutions, creative agency and marketing company
- Planquette, veal
- Sioen Industries, textile manufacturer (mainly coated textiles, sails, fine chemicals and professional protective clothing).
- Trans Novero, truck company
- Unifrost, frozen vegetables
- Vitalo, packaging
- Voeders Callewaert, animal nutrition

In 2001 and 2005 Ardooie won the Prize for the most profit-making municipality in West Flanders, announced by the Belgian economic magazine Trends. All except for Vitalo and Trans Novero have their head-office located there.

== Politics ==
- Ardooie has been led for many years by the local VLD-party "Groep82" (Group82) that occupied 2/3 of the seats in 2006 .
- The mayor since 1989 is Karlos Callens, also a Flemish People's representative. He puts a lot effort into making Ardooie known in the world. By his work the Eneco Tour finished and started in Ardooie in 2008 and 2009.

== Events ==
- Cyclocross race in October
- Sint-maartenfeest (St. Martin's Day) (11 November)

== Born in Ardooie ==
- 1858: Victor Roelens, First Bishop of Congo
- 1874: Cyriel Verschaeve, priest, poet and collaborator.
- 1965: Marc Degryse, football player
