= Diocese of Manono =

Roman Catholic diocese in the Democratic Republic of the Congo

Diocese of Manono Dioecesis Manonensis

Location
- Country: Democratic Republic of the Congo
- Metropolitan: Lubumbashi

Statistics
- Area: 45,000 km^{2} (17,000 sq mi)
- Population: Total; Catholics: (as of 2004); 568,748; 152,158 (26.8%)

Information
- Rite: Latin Rite

Current leadership
- Pope: Leo XIV
- Bishop: Vincent de Paul Kwanga Njubu

The Roman Catholic Diocese of Manono (Latin: Manonen(sis)) is a diocese located in the city of Manono in the ecclesiastical province of Lubumbashi in the Democratic Republic of the Congo.

== History ==
- 24 April 1971: Established as Diocese of Manono from the Diocese of Baudouinville, Diocese of Kilwa and Diocese of Kongolo

== Leadership ==
- Bishops of Manono (Latin Rite), in reverse chronological order
  - Bishop Vincent de Paul Kwanga Njubu (since 18 March 2005)
  - Bishop Nestor Ngoy Katahwa (25 September 1989 – 16 November 2000), appointed Bishop of Kolwezi
  - Bishop Gérard Ngoy Kabwe (6 May 1972 – 25 September 1989)

== See also ==
- Roman Catholicism in the Democratic Republic of the Congo

== Sources ==
- GCatholic.org
- Catholic Hierarchy
