= Victor Roelens =

Belgian Catholic priest (1858–1947)

The Reverend Victor Roelens M. Afr.
- Vicar Apostolic of Upper Congo
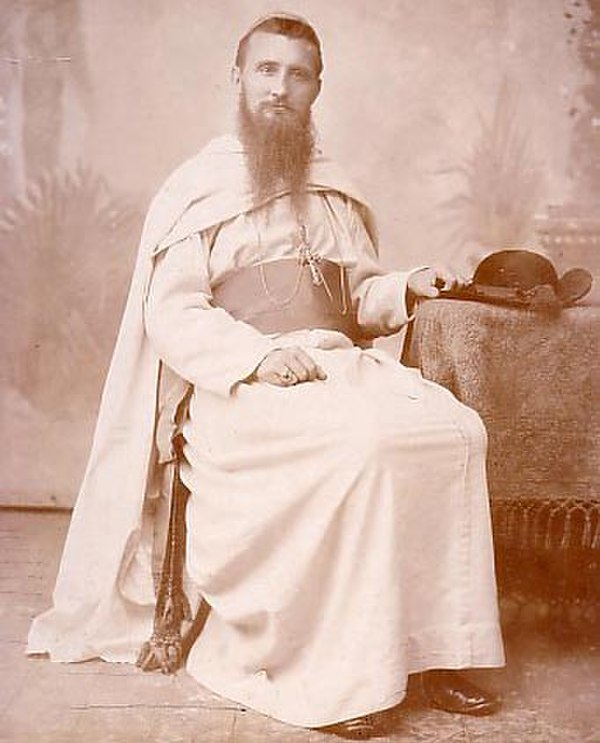
- Church: Roman Catholic
- Installed: 30 March 1895
- Term ended: 22 September 1941
- Successor: Urbain Etienne Morlion
- Other post: Titular Bishop of Girba (30 March 1895 - 25 August 1947)

Orders
- Ordination: 8 September 1884
- Consecration: 10 May 1896 by Archbishop Pierre-Lambert Goossens

Personal details
- Born: 21 July 1858 Ardooie, Belgium
- Died: 5 August 1947 (aged 89)
- Denomination: Catholic
- Parents: Cesar Roelens, Rosalia Vervisch

Victor Roelens, M. Afr. (21 July 1858 – 5 August 1947) was a Belgian Catholic priest who became Vicar Apostolic of Upper Congo in 1895, and remained the premier bishop in the Congo Free State, then the Belgian Congo, until he retired in 1941. He was a member of the Missionaries of Africa.

== Youth ==
Roelens was born on 21 July 1858 in Ardooie as Victor Theodoor Roelens, the third son of Cesar Roelens and his mother, Rosalia Vervisch. He had two older brothers Emiel and Adolf, and two younger sisters Lucia and Marie-Emily. His father was a gardener at the nearby Chateau des Comtes de Jonghe d'Ardoye. Being rather poor, the family received financial support from the castle lords and could send the three sons to college.

Like his brothers before him, Victor boarded at Sint-Jozef College, Tielt, from the age of 13. Though all classes were in French, he quickly learned the language and came out at the top of his class in his first year. During a winter, whilst playing on a pond in Pittem, he slipped and broke his nose, the altered shape of which would remain with him for the rest of his life. At college he supported the Flemish movement. His dream about going to Africa was initially planted by two White Fathers, Charmetant and Moinet, who visited the college to talk about missionary work in Africa. It was further reinforced when his teacher Adolf Loosvelt volunteered to go to Africa. In his final year ("Rhetorica"), and without anyone knowing, Victor sent three letters to three different religious orders, and eventually made up his mind to join the White Fathers. Victor wanted to leave straight after college but his father insisted that he spend one additional year at the Minor Seminary, Roeselare to study philosophy.

== Northern Africa, Europe and Jerusalem ==
In the autumn of 1880, at the age of 22, Victor joined the novitiate of the White Fathers in Algiers, Algeria. In the presence of then bishop Charles Lavigerie, he graduated and became a member of the order of White Fathers on 23 September 1881. During his time in Algiers, Victor visited Carthage to attend the promotion to cardinalship of Charles Lavigerie. He later went back to Carthage to study for two years at the Collège Saint-Louis. During this time he visited local neighbourhoods to care for the sick, and met his first share of disease as he had stomach problems. Cardinal Lavigerie made Victor a priest on 8 September 1884 in Carthage. In 1884, Victor was appointed a teacher at the Apostolic School for Missionaries in Woluwe-Saint-Lambert, near Brussels. Though it was not Victor's first choice to go back to Europe, it allowed him to visit his family. His health recovered. In 1887 we was called back to Carthage as a lecturer, and was also responsible for the operational running of the school. Two years later he was sent to Jeruzalem to teach ecclesiastical history and bible studies in the seminary of Saint Anna. In that same school he later was asked to teach theology, which he had to study intensely as a consequence. During this time his mother died. On 31 May 1891 he received a letter of Cardinal Lavigerie with the announcement of his departure to central Africa. This elated him as his long-lasting dream finally came true.

== Central Africa - Mpala and Saint Louis ==
Roelens found the time to briefly visit Belgium to meet his father and siblings, then left for Africa in July 1891 with a team of White Fathers bound for the Congo. He travelled via Marseille, where he boarded the ship Rio Grande and reached Zanzibar on 31 July. In Zanzibar he purchased supplies for the caravan and organised for 450 carriers and 40 soldiers to join them on the mainland. He sailed from Zanzibar on Monday 24 August 1891 at landed at Bagamoyo late that same day. After some further preparations, the caravan set off on 31 August by crossing the nearby river and moving inland through the former German East-Africa towards Congo. The caravan had many setbacks, such as severe drought, fevers, hunger and the threat of marauding bandits on its way to Msalala in present-day Uganda A part of the carriers left the caravan, having reached their native region. The caravan moved on, hampered severely by the winter rains, and reach the abandoned mission post at Kipalala a few weeks before the year end. Victor organised new carriers at nearby Tabora but this took weeks, as the locals were in full harvest season, so that they celebrated New Year's Day of 1892 in Kipalala. After three additional weeks, during which Victor could study the Kiswahili language, they moved on through the grassy plains, facing new threats such as hyenas, and reached Karema, Tanzania on the shore of lake Tanganyika on 14 February 1892 at 3 in the afternoon. They were greeted by Monseigneur Lechaptois and some missionaries. Victor saw how local orphans were emaciated and weak, and realised how hard his upcoming task would be. After five days of rest the caravan boarded two 12-meter long boats. One boat carried Victor, the other Mgr. Lechaptois. They rowed across the 80 km wide lake with the help of local fishermen. Victor reached the small outpost of Saint Louis at 11 in the evening. He was greeted by captain Joubert, whom Victor had known from his time in Maison Carrée in Algiers. The next day, a mass led by Mgr. Lechaptois was the first sung service in the region. Different teams were formed who would continue to various destinations. Father Marques would lead a team going to Kibanga with father Engels and brother Franciscus. whilst father Victor Roelens and brother Stanislas would start a new mission post of Saint-Louis, next to the existing military stronghold. That same day, the boats with the other teams departed, and Victor went to the mission post of Mpala for a few weeks to study the language, region and customs prior to starting the new mission post. During this time he assisted the local missionaries in caring for the many sick in the surrounding villages. On 16 March, Victor arrived back at Saint Louis and started the construction of a missionary outpost next to the existing military settlement of captain Joubert. Later that same week, Victor baptised his first seven children, which gave him much energy and courage. Three weeks later a 12 by 7 meter wooden house was ready. Mgr. Lechaptois came back from Kibanga and visited Victor around that time. Victor happily showed the progress on the building and farmland that had been made. He also spoke out in favour of schooling local people and for locals to have the possibility of becoming priests, so that they could help spread the gospel in their own villages. However, Mgr. Lechaptois thought it too early and ordered him to first focus the efforts of the natives into construction work and farming. Like other missionaries in the region, Victor had to overcome many tough challenges. Any construction work was under constant threat of destruction from termites, rodents and torrential rains. Caravans bringing supplies were slow and goods often got broken, stolen or lost en route. Yet the biggest challenge facing the locals were diseases like pox, syphilis and feet infections caused by funza fleas, which missionaries had to fight with little or no medicine. Most of the missionaries were frequently ill with fever themselves, and most did not survive for more than a few years.

A few weeks into his new mission post, Victor fell ill with hematuric fever, which became so bad that he received last rites, but he survived and recovered. He visited the military stronghold at Albertville during three days, and met the Belgian captain Jacques who was fighting Arab slave traders active in the region during this period. In October of that year, Roelens received news that father Marques had died from hematuric fever at Kibanga, and that father Engels had fallen ill with it. Mgr Lechaptois sent father Herrebaut to Kibanga to replace both these men. With Herrebaut gone, Roelens had to abandon the mission post at Saint-Louis and moved back to Mpala with brother Stanislas. Having arrived there, Roelens in turn fell ill with a new bout of hematuric fever.

== Baudouinville ==
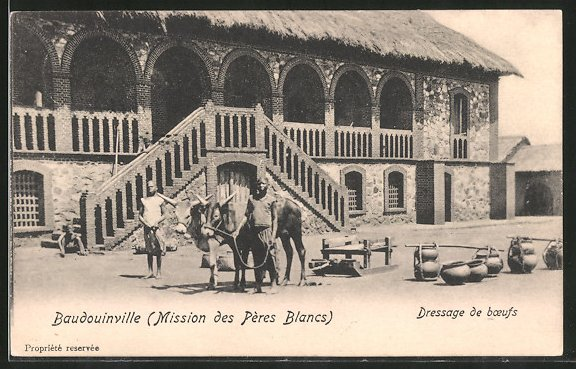
The mission of the White Fathers in Baudouinville

Early the following year, Mgr Lechaptois also ordered that the mission post at Kibanga be abandoned. Their missionaries moved back south and many villagers followed in their wake. To cope with the influx of around one thousand people, Roelens was charged with finding a new location for a new mission post. On 6 February, Roelens travelled to Saint-Louis stayed for two weeks, then left with brother Franciscus and travelled the region for a week, identifying a swamp that could be easily drained as the site of the future mission post "Baudouinville" (French) / "Boudewijnstad" (Dutch) before returning to Saint-Louis for final preparations. Around Easter, and just days before setting off, Roelens had another bout of hematuric fever, forcing him to return to Mpala instead and recover for a few weeks.

At long last, on 8 May 1893, father Roelens and brother Franciscus pitched up their tent on the site of the new mission post. Work started the following week with the cutting of trees and the erection of wooden food storages. Fairly quickly a few hundred locals moved in to stay in the relative safety of the encampment, providing labour for the ambitious project. In July 1893, more than 100 orphans arrived from other posts in the region, bringing the total number of inhabitants of Baudouinville to more than one thousand. In October, the seasonal rains washed away the growing crops and destroyed thousands of clay bricks that were drying in the field. Both presented a severe setback. In the same period, a letter from Europe arrived, announcing that father Roelens had been appointed as provicar of Upper Congo, which added to the already considerable workload of "bwana Mrefoe". In December, the eighth bout of hematuric fever struck him. At the end of that year, three stone-baking ovens had been erected to prepare for brick making and the erection of stone buildings in Baudouinville. In May 1894, the ground work for the warehouse started, and the roof was finished by August of that year. The finishing of the warehouse liberated time for provicar Roelens, who set off to tour the region twice that year, going as far as lake Mweru.

== The bishop ==
Roelens' work in Baudouinville did not stay unremarked in Europe, and on 30 March 1895 he was appointed Vicar Apostolic of Upper Congo and Titular Bishop of Girba. This caused Roelens to travel back to Europe in the company of father Dromaux. They set off around New Year's Day of 1896 and took three months to reach Zanzibar, where they boarded a ship to Europe, reaching Marseille on 16 April 1896 and being sworn in by cardinal Goossens at the chapel of Leliendaal in Mechelen on 10 May 1896. Roelans also met pope Leo XIII in the Vatican during this trip.

Roelens travelled back to Baudouinville by way of Zanzibar in 1897, meeting the English, French and German consuls and the sultan of Zanzibar there. He crossed over to Chinde in Mozambique where he boarded the Sir Henry Johnston and sailed up the Zambezi river, then moved across land to the Shire river and travelled to Fort Johnston, now Mangochi. He crossed lake Malawi on board the Wissman, which called at English, German and Portuguese settlements along the way and arrived in Karonga six days later. There Roelens organised a caravan of 250 people, which left Karonga on 23 July. They crossed the Saisi river and travelled through the forest to the mission post of Kala on lake Tanganyika, where they boarded a rowing boat. Eight days of sailing later they reached Karema, and one more day took them to Saint-Louis, where they met with captain Joubert. Still one day later, Roelens finally reached Baudouinville, where he was met by a crowd of a few thousand people who celebrated his return. He had been away for 20 months.

Immediately upon his return he learned about the deaths of several missionaries, most of whom had been felled by hematuric fever, and he was confronted again with endemic disease, rodent plagues, funza fleas and other harsh realities in middle Africa at that time. On the other hand, with the Arab slave traders gone, the region had become more peaceful, and construction in Baudouinville had progressed handsomely Bishop Roelens started to further organise life in the settlement, a.o. by striving to print books for use in schools and formulating his vision to start a religious school and train locals into becoming clergy and new missionaries.

Around Easter of 1898, bishop Roelens was struck by another bout of hematuric fever, which forced him to stay in bed Thus he missed the inauguration of the church in Mpala, the first church in the broader region. During these days of illness he nevertheless continued to work from his bed, and ordered the construction of a large cathedral in Baudouinville, to be overseen by brother Franciscus. Sources of chalk stone and iron ore were available in the wider region and caravans of locals transported it to the city. Work started, and the cathedral foundations reached ground level in August. On 15 August 1898 the first stone was ceremonially laid. Also in 1898, the first six locals had indicated that they wanted to study and become a priest. Even though none of that first group made it in the end, it was the first sign that Roelens' plans now started to deliver results, vindicating his vision about local education and involvement that he had held ever since his first days in Africa (see higher).

In 1899 bishop Roelens had to overcome major setbacks once more: a fire destroyed the stables in February, killing all animals except for one cow, and later that year brother Franciscus, who oversaw the cathedral construction, had to leave Africa for health reasons.

In 1902, several missionaries died, making Bishop Roelens the sole survivor of the initial caravan of 1891. In the course of 1902, he received a visit from major Justin Malfeyt, governor of East Congo. M. Malfeyt, more familiar with life on the west coast, learned about the many challenges of life in inland Africa and was impressed by the progress visible at Baudouinville. He tried to convince bishop Roelens to create mission posts in the Lualaba district to counter Islamic influence, but Roelens initially refused as it would spread his scarce resources too thinly over too large an area. Nevertheless, Roelens accepted an invitation to visit "Stanleystad" (Dutch), currently Kisangani to which he set off from Mpala with father Van Acker on 7 July on board of the San Vitori. The journey was disrupted by fever of bishop Roelens, forcing them to rest some days in a military settlement in the Lualaba region. They then travelled on, only to see father Van Acker fall ill, stranding them for a while at Lokandu, before finally reaching Stanleystad. There Roelens met with Malfeyt and some twenty state and railway officials to discuss the matter of mission posts in the Lualaba region. After about three weeks, Roelens and Van Acker started the journey back to Baudouinville. They first sailed to Ponthierstad and disembarked there on 18 November to cross the Kasongo region over land. They suffered from heavy rains which forced them to rest for a week at Kabambare, then crossed the Lowa river with great difficulty, and met further difficult conditions so that they reached lake Tanganyika only on 5 February 1903 at Lusenda. They stayed there until 13 June when they pressed on and reached Baudouinville three weeks later. Roelens was elated with how the cathedral had progressed, and after the long and hard journey was happy to be back in his own quarters. An additional source of joy was a letter which had come and was waiting, announcing funds donated by an organisation in Bruges Bishop Roelens decided to allocate it to starting a new mission post in the Maniema region and to honour the gift by giving it the name of "Sint-Donaas-Brugge". On 23 November 1903, Mgr Roelens gave his first sermon in the newly devoted cathedral, being elated with joy after all the years of hardship and setbacks.

In March 1904, Bishop Roelens discussed the new mission post with father De Vulder, who set off shortly afterwards to the Kasongo region in Maniema. In June Mgr Roelens travelled to Maniema himself to safeguard a mission post which was under threat of forced movement by military campaigns He then travelled on to Lusenda, Kabambare, Nyembo and the new mission post of Sint-Donaas-Brugge, facing extreme heat. In Lusenda, Mgr Roelens fell ill with a liver disease. The Italian doctor Moriondo, whom Roelens had met on his journey to Stanleyville, ordered Roelens to travel to Europe and recover. Roelens was able to leave Lusenda only on 1 November and return to Baudouinville.

After having appointed father Huys as his replacement, Mgr Roelens left for Europe and arrived four months later by boat in Antwerp on 8 August 1905. He met the Belgian king. Letters he received during the summer announced the death of five more missionaries, and a letter in spring comes with even worse news: the very lethal sleeping sickness had broken out in the region. Having a very high mortality rate and a then still unknown cause, the disease killed thousands wherever it appeared, leaving missionaries and local people powerless. It spread quickly along lakes and rivers throughout the whole of central Africa. All that people could do was to relocate uphill, to stay away from water, and as much as possible also from each other. In Roelens' region, Mpala was the first to be hit, forcing the religious school to be transferred to the as yet untouched Lusaka.

== Fighting the sleeping sickness ==
Roelens arrived back from Europe in Upper Congo in May 1906. Father De Vulder in Kasongo was the first to brief him on the strange effects of the sleeping sickness and on the abandonment of several mission posts as a result. The cruel disease, which struck men far more often than women, and the devastating effects it had on the local population and on the missionary work, caused Roelens much consternation and despair, yet he did not think of quitting. Father Kindt had left Africa for the Pasteur Institute in Paris in a bid to find the cause and develop a medicine, and returned with knowledge of the cause (trypanosomes), the vector (a fly with the scientific name glossina palpalis but commonly known as the tsetse fly), medicines (atoxyl and strychnine) and in possession of a microscope with which he could check throat smears for the presence of the disease. Shortly afterwards Guastella arrived in Baudouinville on a mission from the Belgian government, soon to be joined by doctor Schwertz. It was decided to abandon Saint-Louis in an attempt to save close by Baudouinville. Schwertz, after having come back from a trip to Mpala, correctly identified that the tsetse fly staid on the banks of rivers and lakes, but not inland, and that it stayed in shady environments and not in direct sunlight. He proposed the bold plan to deforest all river and lake banks to rob the tsetse fly of its habitat by burning the bush and then taking out all roots to prevent them from growing back. As roots often went down to more than a meter, and as Mpala was 50 kilometers away, the task was gargantuan yet Roelens supported the idea and crossed the region personally to convince all villages to come out and help. Over the course of months, the banks from Baudouinville to Mpala were cleared, and this indeed significantly brought down the number of patients in the region.

In those years of disease and many setbacks, the catechist school in Lusaka saw the graduation of its first local student, Stefano Kaoze. He was the sole remaining student of the group of twenty young men that had been picked by Roelens in Mpala to study Latin, and the first to become a White Father himself. Kaoze embodied Roelens' original vision, that had finally come to fruition. On 8 September 1909, Baudouinville celebrated the 25 year priesthood jubilee of Roelens, who could look back on two and a half decennia of hard labour with many setbacks but also many great successes. Shortly afterwards Roelens travelled back to Europe for health reasons, this time staying away for three years.

== First world war and first black priest ==
During his time in Europe, Mgr Roelens engaged in much diplomacy in Belgium, where a political battle was raging about the colonies. Roelens defended the missionary work in the face of political opponents and critics, organised protest marches, and eventually managed to have the Minister of Colonies speak out in favour of missionary work in parliament. When he at last returned to Africa, Mgr Huys was able to proudly report the founding of two new mission posts, Lulenga and Bobandana, in the Kivu region. It was in the mission post of Tielt-Sint-Peter, in the north, that Roelens heard about the start of the first world war of 1914. This resulted in a German blockade of lake Tanganyika, so that Roelens could not return to Baudouinville by boat. As a result, he stayed in Kivu, much to the benefit of his health. He also met Stefano Kaoze there. Roelens managed to reach Baudouinville on 26 December 1916. On 21 July 1917, Roelens' birthday and 25 years after the first missionaries had arrived in the region, Stefano Kaoze became the first local man to be consecrated as a priest in the cathedral of Baudouinville, now in the presence of 4 bishops, 30 priests and by then governor Malfeyt from Stanleyville. Mgr Roelens promised Stefano that he would take him along on his next trip to Europe, on the condition that Stefano learn Flemish.

Stefano did go along on Roelens' trip to Europe, which became something of a celebratory voyage. In Rome they were present at the beatification of the martyrs of Uganda when pope Benedict XV detected the black Stefano in the crowd and stopped to give him his special blessing. The crowd was so taken by Stefano that it took him the rest of the day to leave Saint-Peters square. Later that same week they travelled to Flanders, where Cardinal Mercier and king Albert received Stefano as well. Stefano returned to Africa the following winter, and Mgr Roelens in the following spring. Having found additional funds, Mgr Roelens decided to create a Great Seminary in Kapulo, thus creating a local school to educate priests, as an answer to the increasing numbers of local students. Thirty five years after starting, this was the jewel on Roelens' crown.

In 1938, Mgr Roelens was hospitalised in Albertville with stomach problems when Mgr Huys, having travelled to Mpweto, suffered a heart attack that left him half blind. He was taken to Elisabeth town when he had a second heart attack. He reached Albertville a few months later but died there. The Vatican appointed a new coadjutor and Mgr Roelens felt that it was time to step aside and leave things in the hands of a younger generation. He retired as Apostolic Vicar of Baudouinville on 22 September 1941 and was succeeded by Mgr Morlion.

In the final years of his life, he stayed at Baudouinville and was relieved of all duties. He became hard of hearing. On the afternoon of August 5, 1947, Mgr Roelens received a visit from black seminarians from Kapulo. Noticing his weakness, none of them dared to leave the room, but he reassured them and sent them home. Later that evening, his condition worsened, and he was given last rites. Two sisters kept him company. When he suddenly shivered from cold, he tried to get his hands under the blanket. A sister rose to help him, then returned to her seat, only to discover that he had died by the time she sat down. Victor passed away at 9 p.m. on August 5, 1947 at the age of 89. He was buried the next day. Stefano Kaoze, his first black priest, attended the service.

== Sources ==
- "Bishop Victor Roelens, M. Afr". Catholic Hierarchy.
- Mudimbe, V. Y. (1994). The idea of Africa. Indiana University Press. ISBN 0-253-20872-6.
