= Elie Amsini Kiswaya =

Congolese bishop

- Bishop of Sakania–Kipushi
- Church: Catholic Church
- Diocese: Diocese of Sakania–Kipushi
- In office: 20 November 1975 – 21 December 2001
- Predecessor: Pierre François Lehaen
- Successor: Gaston Kashala Ruwezi

Orders
- Ordination: 26 July 1959
- Consecration: 21 February 1976 by Joseph Malula

Personal details
- Born: 25 August 1928 Kindu, Orientale Province, Belgian Congo, Belgian Empire
- Died: 11 December 2008 (aged 80)

Elie Amsini Kiswaya (25 August 1928 – 11 December 2008) was a Congolese bishop of the Roman Catholic Diocese of Sakania–Kipushi of the Democratic Republic of the Congo from 5 March 1977, until 21 December 2001. He was succeeded by Bishop Gaston Kashala Ruwezi. Kiswaya died on 11 December 2008, at the age of 80.
