= Stefano Kaoze =

Catholic priest (1890–1951)

The Reverend Stefano Kaoze
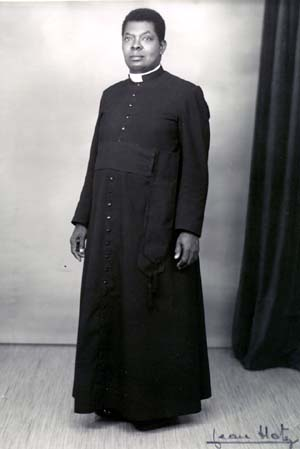
- Born: c.1886 or 1890; Marungu massif
- Died: 23 March 1951 (aged about 61); Albertville, Katanga Province, Belgian Congo
- Occupation: Catholic priest
- Known for: Contribution to historical, linguistic, ethnographic, and folklore of Tanganyika region

Stefano Kaoze (c.1886 or 1890 – 23 March 1951) was a Congolese Catholic priest who has been described as "the first Congolese intellectual". He was the first African to be ordained as a Catholic priest in the Belgian Congo in 1917. In the following years, he wrote widely on a range of subjects connected to history, linguistics, ethnography and folklore of the peoples on the western shore of Lake Tanganyika with a particular interest in his own Tabwa ethnic group.

Kaoze was born in 1886 or 1890 and gained an education at a nearby mission station of the White Fathers and his intelligence was quickly identified. He came under the patronage of Bishop Victor Roelens, who assisted with his passage through nearby seminaries and his ordination in 1917. Kaoze visited Belgium with Roelens in 1920. Kaoze had already written on philosophical subjects and soon became involved in various studies on the history, folklore, and language of his own Tabwa ethnic group.

In later life, Kaoze held a number of official posts on the Commission for the Protection of Natives (French: Commission pour la protection des indigènes) and became one of the first Africans to sit on the Governing Council (Conseil de Gouvernement) advising the Governor-General of the Belgian Congo.

== Early life ==
Kaoze was born in the Marungu massif in the north-eastern portion of Katanga Province in around 1886 or 1890. He was a member of the Sanga (lit. 'bushpig') clan of the Tabwa people but little is known about his early life. Varying accounts of his childhood exist. At the time, there was substantial turbulence in the region around the western shore of Lake Tanganyika as a result of the Arab slave trade spreading westwards from the Swahili coast and, from 1883, also the eastwards encroachment of European colonialism in the form of the International African Association and Catholic missions.

== Education and ordination ==
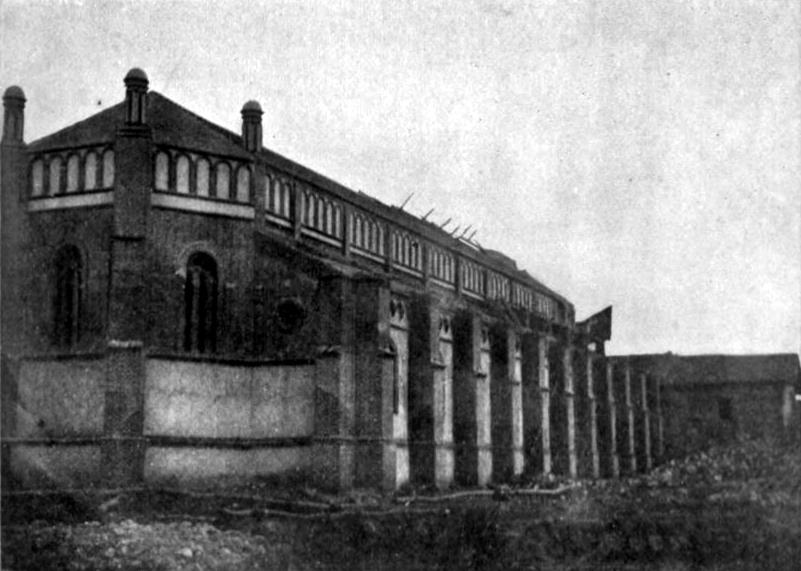
View of the White Fathers mission at Mpala, c.1905

As an adolescent, Kaoze moved with his family to the mission station, originally an orphanage and refuge for freed slaves, at Mpala which had recently been established by the White Fathers. This was possibly because his mother had been accused of witchcraft or was seeking to escape from a family or clan feud. Baptised a Catholic and taking the name Stéphane or its local phonetic rendering Stefano, he showed "exceptional intelligence" in the mission's rudimentary schools. A gifted linguist, he learned Latin, French, Dutch and Kiswahili in addition to his native Kitabwa. He was one of the first pupils admitted to the minor seminary at Mpala on its establishment in 1899. He was then sent to continue his education at the major seminary in Baudouinville (modern-day Kirungu) where he proved extremely popular with his tutors. Kaoze came under the personal patronage of Monseigneur Victor Roelens, recently appointed as Vicar Apostolic of the Belgian Congo, who furthered Kaoze's career.

While at Baudouinville, Kaoze was asked by a local magistrate to write an essay on "The Psychology of the Bantu" (La Psychologie des Bantu) which was intended to vindicate the "fundamental equality" of all human beings in the face of contemporary interest in scientific racism, considered un-Catholic. The text was later published in the Revue Congolaise in 1910 and is believed to have been the first piece of writing published in French by an African. It caused a "sensation" in Europe, calling for the creation of an "African Christianity" which fused elements of Christianity with indigenous beliefs and involved the preaching of the Gospel in African languages. Still under Roelens' patronage, Kaoze was ordained as a priest on 22 July 1917 and became the first African to be ordained in the Belgian Congo.

== Missionary work and European visit ==
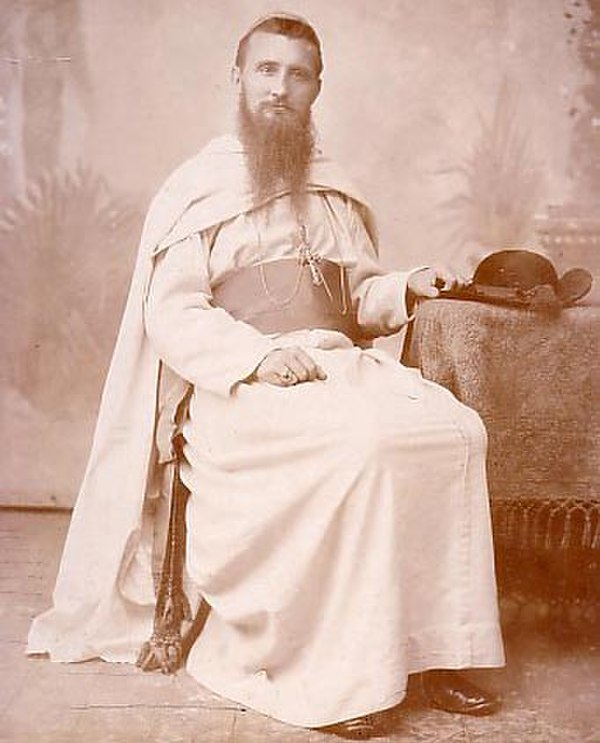
Bishop Victor Roelens, pictured in 1896

Immediately after his ordination, Kaoze was dispatched to teach at the minor seminary in Karema in Belgian-occupied German East Africa. After Easter in 1918, he was transferred to the minor seminary in Lusaka in the Upper Congo. The mission suffered from an outbreak of Spanish flu, and Kaoze contracted the illness, but quickly recovered. He accompanied Roelens on a tour of Congolese missions in 1919 and was received positively by other missionaries.

Later in 1919 he travelled in Roelens' entourage to the headquarters of the White Fathers at Algiers in French Algeria and then to Rome to attend the beatification of the Uganda Martyrs in June 1920. He arrived in Belgium later the same year and preached in a number of schools and churches. He was received by King Albert I in Brussels. In the course of his visit, Kaoze met the Congolese agronomist Paul Panda Farnana and Kaoze's viewpoint was substantially altered by his visit to Europe.

Kaoze was acutely conscious of the importance of race and social division which had been heightened by his European visit. On his return, he began work on a major universal history of the Tabwa people with whom he closely identified. The work emphasised the primacy of his own Sanga clan. He published various works on Tabwa language and culture including a Tabwa grammar and Tabwa-French dictionary. In the following years, he wrote widely as a self-taught ethnographer and folklorist. Most of his work was never published. He served as a teacher and parish priest at Lusaka in 1924.

Kaoze was permitted to found new mission station at Nkala in 1933 to be staffed entirely by African priests. He remained the parish head there until he was sent back to Lusaka to serve as a priest in 1943. He remained posted there until 1950.

== Political role ==
With support from Roelens, Kaoze was made a member of the Commission for the Protection of Natives (Commission pour la protection des indigènes) in 1946. In the same year, he was among the first Africans to sit on the Governing Council (Conseil de Gouvernement) in Léopoldville (modern-day Kinshasa) which advised the Governor-General. He frequently traveled to Léopoldville and Élisabethville from 1946 to 1948 when the bodies were in session. During the Governing Council's sessions in 1947, he rejected a proposal to issue special cards for évolués that would grant them privileged status, instead arguing that the Belgians should treat the Congolese according to their developmental attainment. He also expressed his dissatisfaction with being forced to sit with Asians on segregated boats instead of his white fellow clergymen when traveling on Lake Tanganyika.

== Later life ==
Kaoze fell seriously ill in 1950 and was sent to Albertville (modern-day Kalemie) for treatment. By the following year it was apparent that he would likely not recover and he was admitted to the city's European hospital. He died at the hospital on Easter Sunday 25 March 1951. A requiem Mass was held for him at a church in the city.

== Legacy ==
Kaoze has been described as the "first Congolese intellectual". "The Psychology of the Bantu" was an influence on the more famous Bantu Philosophy (La Philosophie bantoue) by the Belgian missionary Placide Tempels first published in 1945.
