= Kongolo Bridge =

- Coordinates: 5°20′50″S 27°00′33″E
- Carries: Motor vehicles, heavy weight
- Crosses: Lualaba River
- Locale: Kongolo, Democratic Republic of Congo
- Official name: None

Characteristics
- Material: Reinforced concrete, metal
- Total length: 70 m
- Width: 5 m

History
- Construction start: 1939

Location
- Interactive map of Kongolo Bridge

Kongolo Bridge is a cantilever rail and road bridge that crosses the Lualaba River. It was constructed by Belgians in 1939 and was reconstructed in 1968 under the Mobutu regime by the German engineer Erich F. Weigl. It is located north of the town of Kongolo.

The width of the Lualaba river is about 440 m, while the main span of the bridge is 70 meters, and has a single 5-meter-wide lane for all traffic, including dual-gauge rails.

== See also ==
- List of road-rail bridges
