= Sts. Peter and Paul Cathedral, Lubumbashi =

Church in Haut-Katanga Province, Congo

Sts. Peter and Paul Cathedral
- Cathédrale Saints Pierre et Paul de Lubumbashi
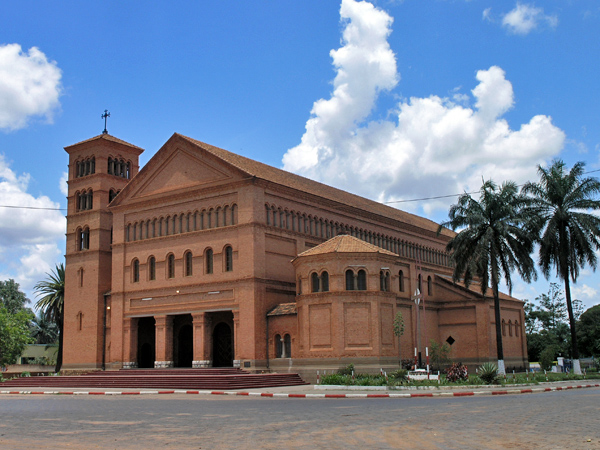
- Sts. Peter and Paul Cathedral
- 11.6657°S 27.4797°E
- Location: Lubumbashi, Haut-Katanga Province
- Country: Democratic Republic of the Congo
- Language: French
- Denomination: Catholic

History
- Status: Church (Cathedral)
- Founded: 1920

Architecture
- Functional status: Active

Administration
- Diocese: Archdiocese of Lubumbashi

Clergy
- Archbishop: Fulgence Muteba

Cathedral of Saints Peter and Paul in Lubumbashi (French: Cathédrale Saints Pierre et Paul de Lubumbashi) or simply Lubumbashi Cathedral , in the city of Lubumbashi, Haut-Katanga Province in the Democratic Republic of the Congo, is a parish of the Roman Catholic Church and the seat of the Metropolitan Archdiocese of Lubumbashi (Archidioecesis Lubumbashiensis). The cathedral church is located between Kapenda and Kasa-Vubu avenues. The Convent of St. Peter and St. Paul and several provincial government buildings are located nearby.

The Romanesque Revival church dates to 1920, when the area was under Belgian colonial rule. It was elevated to cathedral status with the promotion of the Apostolic Vicariate of Katanga to diocesan status in 1959, by the Bull "Cum parvulum" of Pope John XXIII. It is under the pastoral responsibility of the Bishop Jean-Pierre Tafunga.

== See also ==
- Catholic Church in the Democratic Republic of the Congo
