= Ardooie Castle =

Castle in Ardooie, Belgium

Coordinates: 50°57′50″N 3°14′2.8″E

Ardooie Castle Kasteel van Ardooie
- Ardooie, West Flanders, Belgium
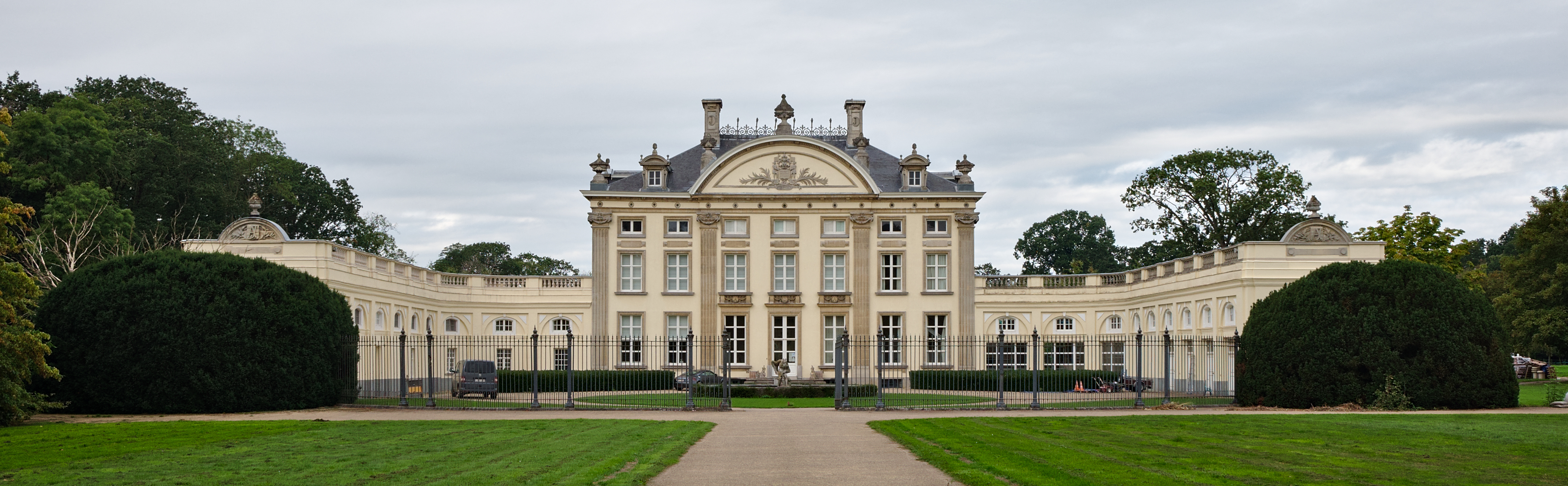

Site information
- Type: Castle

Ardooie Castle is a castle in Ardooie, Belgium.

== The castle ==
The castle was built in the classical style at the end of the 18th century. It is located next to the provincial domain 't Veld. The actual castle grounds of 28 hectares, is private and not open to the public. The castle was also formerly known as Kasteel de Jonghe d'Ardoye.

The castle was badly damaged during the French Revolution (1794), World War I and World War II. In 1981, the castle was sold by the last lord de Jonghe d'Ardoye, to a new private owner, and a large portion of the castle park was sold to the Province of West Flanders. This portion of the park has been open to the public as the provincial domain "'t Veld" since 1982.

== See also ==
- List of castles in Belgium
