= Gentinnes =

Village of Wallonia, Belgium

Coordinates: 50°35′N 4°36′E

Gentinnes (Walloon: Djintene) is a village of Wallonia and district of the municipality of Chastre, located in the province of Walloon Brabant, Belgium.
