= Kipushi =

- Commune
- Location in the Democratic Republic of the Congo
- Coordinates: 11°46′01″S 27°13′59″E
- Country: DR Congo
- Province: Haut-Katanga
- Territory: Kipushi
- Elevation: 1,329 m (4,360 ft)

Population (2012)
  - Total: 132,861
- Time zone: UTC+2 (Central Africa Time)
- Climate: Cwa

A day in Kipushi.

Kipushi is a border city in Haut-Katanga province, Democratic Republic of the Congo. It lies 35 km southwest of the city of Lubumbashi, very close to the border with Zambia, at an altitude of 1329 m (4363 ft). The main economic activity of the town is mining. Kipushi is part of the Roman Catholic Diocese of Sakania–Kipushi.

== Climate ==
Kipushi has a humid subtropical climate (Köppen: Cwa).

Climate data for Kipushi
Month	Jan	Feb	Mar	Apr	May	Jun	Jul	Aug	Sep	Oct	Nov	Dec	Year
Daily mean °C (°F)	21.3 (70.3)	21.4 (70.5)	21.2 (70.2)	20.4 (68.7)	18.1 (64.6)	15.5 (59.9)	15.2 (59.4)	17.4 (63.3)	20.8 (69.4)	22.7 (72.9)	22.2 (72.0)	21.3 (70.3)	19.8 (67.6)
Average precipitation mm (inches)	258 (10.2)	261 (10.3)	206 (8.1)	53 (2.1)	4 (0.2)	1 (0.0)	0 (0)	0 (0)	2 (0.1)	44 (1.7)	178 (7.0)	260 (10.2)	1,267 (49.9)
Source: Climate-Data.org

== From town to city ==
On 22 May 2026, Kipushi was officially elevated from a border town (cité) to border city (ville) status by decree of Vice-Prime Minister of the Interior, Jacquemain Shabani. It became the fourth recognized city of the Haut-Katanga province, joining Lubumbashi, Likasi, and Kasumbalesa. Justin Tambwe Yatumba was appointed interim mayor, with Innocent Mbayo wa Lumbu as deputy mayor.

== Kipushi Mine ==
The Kipushi Mine (formerly Prince Léopold Mine) produces copper, lead and zinc. Ore occurs in open spaces and collapse breccias along a fault zone. The primary zinc-rich ore body contains the minerals sphalerite, galena, pyrite, and arsenopyrite, accompanied by renierite, and some germanite and gallite. These minerals were overprinted by a formation of mostly copper-rich minerals, including cobalt-bearing chalcopyrite, and germanium and silver-bearing bornite, plus molybdenite. The ore body is estimated to have contained 70 million tonnes of ore, with an average of 4.8% Cu, 8.8% Zn and 0.5% Pb. From 1925 to 1986 the mine at Kipushi produced 3.8 million tonnes of copper, 5.9 million tonnes of zinc, 0.4 million tonnes of lead, 45,000 tonnes of cadmium, and 120 tonnes of germanium, plus other elements.

== Notable residents ==
- Ilunga Mande Zatara - Olympic marathon runner for DR Congo
- Mulumba Lukoji - Former Prime Minister of DR Congo
- Justin Tambwe Yatumba - First mayor of Kipushi
