= Fungurume =

- Commune
- Location in DRC
- Coordinates: 10°37′S 26°18′E
- Country: DRC
- Province: Lualaba
- Territory: Lubudi

Population (2012)
  - Total: 34,104
- Time zone: UTC+2 (Central Africa Time)
- Climate: Cwb

Fungurume is a town in Lualaba province, in southeast Democratic Republic of the Congo. In 2012, it had a population of 34,104, up from 28,938 in 2008.

The city is located about 200 kilometers from Lubumbashi. Its economy is mostly based around copper and cobalt mines.
