= Diocese of Kamina =

Roman Catholic diocese in the Democratic Republic of the Congo

Coordinates: 8.7331°S 24.9991°E

Diocese of Kamina Dioecesis Kaminaensis

Location
- Country: Democratic Republic of the Congo
- Metropolitan: Lubumbashi

Statistics
- Area: 73,479 km^{2} (28,370 sq mi)
- Population: Total; Catholics: (as of 2003); 746,223; 199,916 (26.8%)

Information
- Rite: Latin Rite

Current leadership
- Pope: Leo XIV
- Bishop: Léonard Kakudji Muzinga
- Bishops emeritus: Jean-Anatole Kalala Kaseba

The Roman Catholic Diocese of Kamina (Latin: Kainaën(sis)) is a diocese located in the city of Kamina in the ecclesiastical province of Lubumbashi in the Democratic Republic of the Congo.

== History ==
- 18 July 1922: Established as Apostolic Prefecture of Lulua and Central Katanga from the Apostolic Vicariate of Upper Kasai and Apostolic Prefecture of Katanga
- 26 February 1934: Promoted as Apostolic Vicariate of Lulua and Central Katanga
- 8 July 1948: Renamed as Apostolic Vicariate of Lulua
- 10 November 1959: Promoted as Diocese of Kamina

== Leadership ==
Bishops of Kamina

- Bishop Léonard Kakudji Muzinga (since 11 November 2023)
- Bishop Jean-Anatole Kalala Kaseba (22 January 1990 – 3 December 2020)
- Bishop Barthélémy Malunga (11 March 1971 – 22 January 1990)
- Bishop Victor Petrus Keuppens, O.F.M. (10 November 1959 – 11 March 1971)

Vicars Apostolic of Lulua

- Bishop Victor Petrus Keuppens, O.F.M. (25 June 1950 – 10 November 1959)
- Bishop Camillo Paolo A. Stappers, O.F.M. (26 February 1934 – 1949)

Prefect Apostolic of Lulua and Central Katanga

- Father Camillo Paolo A. Stappers, O.F.M. (15 July 1922 – 26 February 1934)

Auxiliaries

- Barthélémy Malunga (1969-1971)

== See also ==
- Roman Catholicism in the Democratic Republic of the Congo

== Sources ==
- GCatholic.org
- Catholic Hierarchy
