= Floribert Songasonga Mwitwa =

Congolese Roman Catholic archbishop (1937–2020)

- Archbishop of Lubumbashi
- Church: Catholic Church
- Archdiocese: Archdiocese of Lubumbashi
- In office: 22 May 1998 – 1 December 2010
- Predecessor: Eugène Kabanga Songasonga
- Successor: Jean-Pierre Tafunga Mbayo
- Previous post: Bishop of Kolwezi (1974-1998)

Orders
- Ordination: 14 August 1963
- Consecration: 24 August 1974 by Joseph Malula

Personal details
- Born: 29 August 1937 Kalasa (north of present-day Lubumbashi), Katanga Province, Belgian Congo, Belgian Empire
- Died: 31 December 2020 (aged 83) Lubumbashi, Haut-Katanga Province, Democratic Republic of the Congo

Floribert Songasonga Mwitwa (29 August 1937 – 31 December 2020) was a Democratic Republic of the Congo, Roman Catholic archbishop.

Songasonga Mwitwa was born in 1937 and was ordained to the priesthood in 1963. He served as bishop of the Roman Catholic Diocese of Kolwezi from 1974 to 1998 and as archbishop of the Roman Catholic Archdiocese of Lubumbashi, Democratic Republic of the Congo, from 1998 to 2010.
