= Diocese of Kalemie–Kirungu =

Roman Catholic diocese in the Democratic Republic of the Congo

Coordinates: 7.0594°S 29.7320°E

Diocese of Kalemie–Kirungu Dioecesis Kalemiensis-Kirunguensis

Location
- Country: Democratic Republic of the Congo
- Metropolitan: Lubumbashi

Statistics
- Area: 71,577 km^{2} (27,636 sq mi)
- Population: Total; Catholics: (as of 2004); 980,000; 562,200 (57.4%)

Information
- Rite: Latin Rite

Current leadership
- Pope: Leo XIV
- Bishop: Jean-Christophe Amade Aloma, M. Afr.

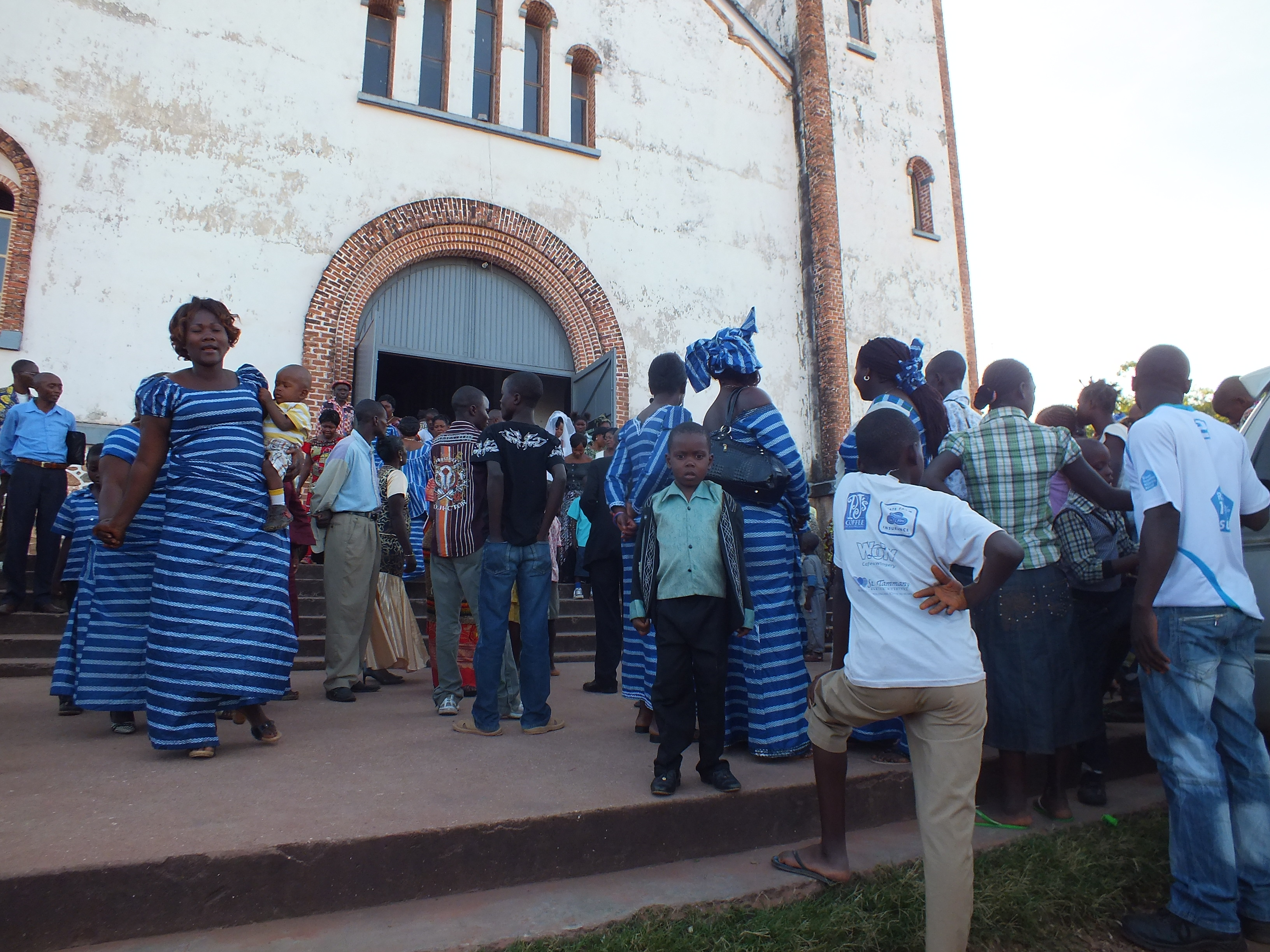
A wedding held at the a church in Kalemie Tanganyika in the diocese.

The Roman Catholic Diocese of Kalemie–Kirungu (French: Diocèse catholique romain de Kalemie–Kirungu) (Latin: Kalemien(sis) – Kirunguen(sis)) is a diocese located in the city of Kalemie–Kirungu in the ecclesiastical province of Lubumbashi in the Democratic Republic of the Congo.

== History ==
- 11 January 1887: Established as Apostolic Vicariate of Upper Congo from the Apostolic Vicariate of Tanganyika in Tanzania
- 26 December 1929: Some territory was lost to establish the Apostolic Vicariate of Kivu
- 11 July 1939: Renamed as Apostolic Vicariate of Baudouinville
- 10 January 1952: Some territory was lost to establish the Apostolic Vicariate of Kasongo
- 10 November 1959: Promoted as Diocese of Baudouinville
- 24 April 1971: Some territory was lost to establish the Diocese of Manono
- 8 May 1971: Lost territory to the Diocese of Kongolo
- 22 August 1972: Renamed as Diocese of Kalemie – Kirungu

== Bishops ==
=== Ordinaries, in reverse chronological order ===
- Bishops of Kalemie–Kirungu (Latin Rite)
  - Bishop Jean-Christophe Amade Aloma, M. Afr. (since 31 March 2015)
  - Bishop Dominique Kimpinde Amando (31 March 1989 – 15 September 2010)
  - Bishop André Ilunga Kaseba (9 April 1979 – 21 August 1988)
  - Bishop Joseph Mulolwa (22 August 1972 – 11 November 1978); see below
- Bishops of Baudouinville (Latin Rite)
  - Bishop Joseph Mulolwa (29 September 1966 – 22 August 1972); see above
  - Bishop Urbain Étienne Morlion, M. Afr. (10 November 1959 – 29 September 1966); see below
- Vicars Apostolic of Baudouinville (Latin Rite)
  - Bishop Urbain Étienne Morlion, M. Afr. (22 September 1941 – 10 November 1959); see above
  - Bishop Victor Roelens, M. Afr. (11 July 1939 – 22 September 1941); see below
- Vicar Apostolic of Upper Congo (Latin Rite)
  - Bishop Victor Roelens, M. Afr. (30 March 1895 – 11 July 1939); see above

=== Coadjutor vicars apostolic ===
- Auguste-Léopold Huys, M. Afr. (1909-1938), died (did not succeed to see)
- Urbain Etienne Morlion, M. Afr. (1939-1941)

== See also ==
- Roman Catholicism in the Democratic Republic of the Congo

== Sources ==
- GCatholic.org
- Catholic Hierarchy
