= Jean-Pierre Tafunga Mbayo =

Congolese catholic priest (1942–2021)

Jean-Pierre Tafunga Mbayo SDB
- Archbishop of Lubumbashi
- Church: Catholic Church
- Archdiocese: Archdiocese of Lubumbashi
- In office: 1 December 2010 – 31 March 2021
- Predecessor: Floribert Songasonga Mwitwa
- Successor: Fulgence Muteba Mugalu
- Previous posts: Coadjutor Archbishop of Lubumbashi (2008-2010); Bishop of Uvira (2002-2008); Bishop of Kilwa–Kasenga (1992-2002)

Orders
- Ordination: 16 September 1972
- Consecration: 31 January 1993 by Eugène Kabanga Songasonga

Personal details
- Born: 25 July 1942 Panda, Likasi, Katanga Province, Belgian Congo, Belgian Empire
- Died: 31 March 2021 (aged 78) Pretoria, South Africa

Jean-Pierre Tafunga Mbayo (25 July 1942 – 31 March 2021) was a Democratic Republic of the Congo, Roman Catholic archbishop.

Tafunga Mbayo was born in the Democratic Republic of the Congo and was ordained to the priesthood in 1972. He served as bishop of the Roman Catholic Diocese of Kilwa-Kasenga, Democratic Republic of the Congo, from 1995 to 2002 and as bishop of the Roman Catholic Diocese of Uvira, Democratic Republic of the Congo, from 2002 to 2008. He then served as coadjutor archbishop and archbishop of the Roman Catholic Archdiocese of Lubumbashi, Democratic Republic of the Congo, from 2008 until his death in 2021.
