= Fulgence Muteba Mugalu =

Congolese Catholic prelate (born in 1962)

The Most Reverend Fulgence Muteba Mugalu
- Archbishop of Lubumbashi, Democratic Republic of the Congo
- Church: Catholic Church
- Archdiocese: Roman Catholic Archdiocese of Lubumbashi
- See: Lubumbashi
- Appointed: 22 May 2021
- Installed: 10 July 2021
- Predecessor: Jean-Pierre Tafunga Mbayo
- Successor: Incumbent
- Other posts: Bishop of Kilwa-Kasenga (18 March 2005 - 22 May 2021); Apostolic Administrator of Kamina (3 December 2020 - 2 February 2024); Apostolic Administrator of Kilwa-Kasenga (22 May 2021 - 10 July 2021)

Orders
- Ordination: 5 August 1990
- Consecration: 23 July 2005 by Dominique Kimpinde Amando
- Rank: Bishop

Personal details
- Born: Fulgence Muteba Mugalu; 9 July 1962 (age 64) Kongolo, Diocese of Kongolo, Tanganyika Province, DR Congo
- Motto: Instaurare omnia in Christo

Styles of Fulgence Muteba Mugalu
- Reference style: Your Lordship; The Most Reverend
- Spoken style: His Lordship
- Religious style: Archbishop

Fulgence Muteba Mugalu (born 9 July 1962) is a Congolese Catholic prelate who serves as Archbishop of the Roman Catholic Archdiocese of Lubumbashi, in the Democratic Republic of the Congo, since 22 May 2021. Before that, from 18 March 2005 until 22 May 2021, he was Bishop of the Roman Catholic Diocese of Kilwa-Kasenga in the DR Congo. He was appointed bishop on 18 March 2005 by Pope Benedict XVI. He was consecrated and installed at Kilwa on 23 July 2005. He concurrently served as the Apostolic Administrator of the Catholic Diocese of Kamina from 3 December 2020 until 2 February 2024 and as Apostolic Administrator of Kilwa-Kasenga Diocese from 22 May 2021 until 10 July 2021.

== Background and priesthood ==
He was born on 9 July 1962 in Kongolo, Kongolo Diocese, Tanganyika Province, DR Congo. He graduated with a degree in pastoral theology from the University of Montreal in Canada. He was ordained a priest of Kongolo Diocese on 5 August 1990. He served as priest until 18 March 2005.

== As bishop ==
On 18 March 2005, Pope John Paul II appointed him as bishop of the Roman Catholic Diocese of Kilwa-Kasenga, DRC. He was consecrated and installed at Kilwa, on 23 July 2005 by the hands of Bishop Dominique Kimpinde Amando, Bishop of Kalemie-Kirungu assisted by Bishop Jérôme Nday Kanyangu Lukundwe, Bishop of Kongolo and Bishop Nestor Ngoy Katahwa, Bishop of Kolwezi.

On 22 May 2021, Pope Francis appointed him archbishop of the Metropolitan Province of Lubumbashi. He was installed there on 10 July 2021.

== Assignments ==
During his episcopal journey, he has served in various roles while priest, bishop and archbishop including:

- Professor of theology in Lubumbashi, while a priest.
- Professor of theology at the Catholic University of Kinshasa, while a priest.
- Secretary of the Episcopal Commission for the Doctrine of the Faith of the Episcopal Conference of the Democratic Republic of the Congo (CENCO), while a priest.
- Secretary General of the CENCO Episcopal Conference, while a priest.
- Coordinator of the Inter-Diocesan Commission for Justice and Peace of the Ecclesiastical Province of Lubumbashi, while bishop
- President of the Episcopal Commission for the Doctrine of Faith of the CENCO, while bishop.
- President of the Board of Directors of the Catholic University of Congo, while bishop.
- Apostolic Administrator of Kamina Diocese from 3 December 2020 until 2 February 2024, while bishop and archbishop.
- Apostolic Administrator of Kilwa-Kasenga Diocese from 22 May 2021 until 10 July 2021, while archbishop
- Elected president of CENCO in June 2024, while archbishop.

== See also ==
- Catholic Church in the Democratic Republic of the Congo

== Succession table ==
Catholic Church titles
Preceded by Jean-Pierre Tafunga Mbayo (6 October 1992 - 10 June 2002)	Bishop of Kilwa-Kasenga (18 March 2005 - 22 May 2021)	Succeeded by Désiré Lenge Mukwenye (since 17 January 2024)
Preceded by Jean-Pierre Tafunga Mbayo (1 December 2010 - 31 March 2021)	Archbishop of Lubumbashi (since 22 May 2021)	Succeeded by Incumbent
