= Kongolo, Tanganyika =

Town in the Democratic Republic of the Congo

Coordinates: 05°24′S 27°00′E

Kongolo is a town in Tanganyika Province in the Democratic Republic of the Congo.

Kongolo has long been a crossroads of inter-ethnic politics, and due to its location on the Lualaba River, the largest headstream of the Congo River, riverine trade has been prominent. Kongolo's railway hub made it an important link between the Copper Belt and bases north, as well as connected Congo to eastern Africa and the Indian Ocean through its eastward branch to provincial capital Kalemie on Lake Tanganyika.

== Population ==
Kongolo has 62,455 residents.

== Namesakes ==
There are other towns in Congo with the same name.

== Transport ==
Kongolo is served by a railway station on the national system, which bridges the Lualaba River at this point via the Kongolo Bridge. The city lies across the river from Regional Road 631 (R631), linking to Mbulula, Kayuyu, Lubao, Kabalo, and Nyunzu; and is also on the (much smaller) Regional Road 632 (R632).

== History ==
=== Equatorial Africa political tradition ===
Kongolo's agricultural fertility, through ready access to fresh water, attracted a number of groups to settle there during the 17th and 18th centuries: the Hêmbá, the Luba-Katanga, and the Bango Bango.

=== Zanzibari occupation ===
Slaver-merchants, the Zanzibaris arrived from Tanzania in the late nineteenth century. They promoted local leaders and allowed them to rule arbitrarily as long as they supplied them with ivory and enslaved people.

=== Late Colonial period (1940-1956) ===
After World War II, the Catholic Church developed a less combative relationship with the Belgian colonial administration. Older missionaries were replaced with new ones, who were not familiar with the proto-colonial period. Missionaries influenced the colonial construction of chieftainship, often in direct contradiction to the wishes of the government. Many Congolese came to the Catholic missions for social mobility, and a literate middle clsas developed that contributed to the growth of an agro-industrial state complex in Kongolo. Farmers satirized the colonial state but did not launch nationalist movements. The above meant that militant nationalists from outside the territory identified many people in Kongolo strongly with Belgian colonialism.

=== Decolonization ===
When decolonization came, European missionaries were identified more with the outgoing colonial administration than with the new Congolese one.

On 1 January 1962, one Dutch and nineteen Belgian missionaries, including the Crauwels brothers, Michel Vanduffel, and Theo Schildermans were killed by nationalists. Many White Catholic Fathers left.

=== Project North Shaba ===
Project North Shaba (PNS) was funded by the US Agency for International Development (USAID) from 1976 to 1986. It increased exports of maize to central and southern cities in Shaba province and provided affordable food for workers. Unlike its colonial precedents and its post-colonial contemporaries, the project integrated local farmers' expertise towards better outcomes and to change patterns of "top-down" development. PNS briefly addressed the Zaïrian government's neglect of agriculture, helping it survive despite the financial pressures of the 1970s and 1980s.

=== 21st century ===
In June 2019, bishop Oscar Ngoy wa Mpanga of the diocese of Kongolo announced the initiation of the beatification process of the one Dutch and nineteen Belgian missionaries killed during the Kongolo Massacre.

In 2021, the UNHCR issued an alert for "widespread and systematic" sexual attacks in Tanganyika, Province, including abductions and enslavement, linked to violence over gold. In two weeks alone, the Kongolo and Mbulula health zones recorded 243 incidents of rape in 12 different villages. Between May and August, more than 23,000 people were displaced in Kongolo Territory.

== See also ==
- Railway stations in DRCongo
