= Jérôme Nday Kanyangu Lukundwe =

Jérôme Nday Kanyangu Lukundwe (1929 – 13 June 2011) was the Roman Catholic bishop of the Roman Catholic Diocese of Kongolo, Democratic Republic of the Congo.

Ordained a priest in 1962, Nday Kanyangu Lukundwe was appointed bishop of the Kongolo Diocese in 1971; he retired in 2007.
