= Archdiocese of Lubumbashi =

Roman Catholic archdiocese in the Democratic Republic of the Congo

Coordinates: 11.6657°S 27.4798°E

Archdiocese of Lubumbashi Archidioecesis Lubumbashiensis Archidiocèse de Lubumbashi
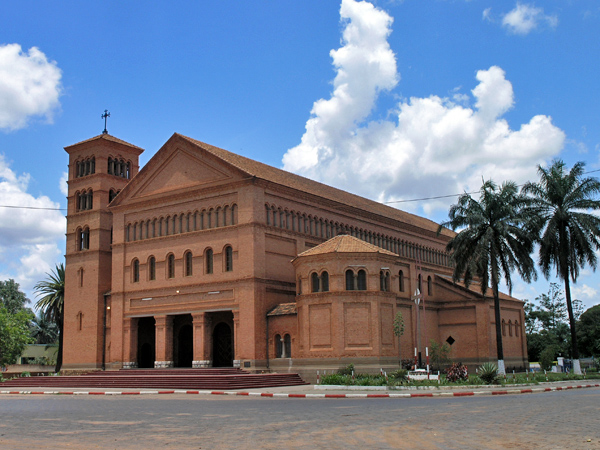
- Lubumbashi Cathedral

Location
- Country: Democratic Republic of the Congo
- Headquarters: Lubumbashi, Democratic Republic of the Congo

Statistics
- Area: 61,828 km^{2} (23,872 sq mi)
- Population: Total; Catholics: (as of 2023); 3,796,000; 2,064,000 (54.4%)
- Parishes: 84

Information
- Denomination: Catholic Church
- Sui iuris church: Latin Church
- Rite: Roman Rite
- Established: 5 August 1910; 115 years ago
- Cathedral: Sts. Peter and Paul Cathedral, Lubumbashi
- Secular priests: 409

Current leadership
- Pope: Leo XIV
- Metropolitan Archbishop: Fulgence Muteba Mugalu
- Auxiliary Bishops: Jean-Marie Vianney Musul Masas

The Roman Catholic Archdiocese of Lubumbashi (Latin: Lubumbashien(sis)) is the Metropolitan See for the ecclesiastical province of Lubumbashi in the Democratic Republic of the Congo.

== History ==
- 5 August 1910: Established as Apostolic Prefecture of Katanga, on territory split from the Apostolic Vicariate of Léopoldville
- 18 July 1922: Lost territory to establish the Apostolic Prefecture of Lulua Katanga (now its suffragan dioceses of Kamina and Kolwezi)
- 12 May 1925: Lost territory to establish the Apostolic Prefecture of Upper Luapula (now its suffragan Sakania–Kipushi)
- 22 March 1932: Promoted as Apostolic Vicariate of Katanga, still exempt, i.e. directly subject to the Holy See
- 10 November 1959: Promoted as Metropolitan Archdiocese of Elisabethville
- 30 May 1966: Renamed as Metropolitan Archdiocese of Lubumbashi
- 13 November 1976: Lost territory to the suffragan Roman Catholic Diocese of Sakania–Kipushi
- 5 March 1977: Lost territory to the suffragan Roman Catholic Diocese of Kilwa–Kasenga
- August 1985: Enjoyed a papal visit by Pope John Paul II.

== Special churches ==
The seat of the archbishop is the Cathedral of Saints Peter and Paul (French: Cathédrale Saints Pierre et Paul) in Lubumbashi.

== Bishops ==
=== Ordinaries in reverse chronological order ===
- Metropolitan Archbishops of Lubumbashi (Latin Rite), below
  - Archbishop Fulgence Muteba Mugalu (since 22 May 2021)
  - Archbishop Jean-Pierre Tafunga Mbayo, S.D.B. (1 December 2010 – 31 March 2021)
  - Archbishop Floribert Songasonga Mwitwa (22 May 1998 – 1 December 2010), resigned
  - Archbishop Eugène Kabanga Songasonga (13 April 1967 – 25 March 1998), resigned
  - Archbishop José Floriberto Cornelis, O.S.B. (10 November 1959 – 13 April 1967), resigned; see below
- Vicars Apostolic of Katanga (Latin Rite), below
  - Bishop José Floriberto Cornelis, O.S.B. (27 November 1958 – 10 November 1959); see above
  - Bishop Jean-Félix de Hemptinne, O.S.B. (15 March 1932 – 6 February 1958); see below
- Prefect Apostolic of Katanga (Latin Rite), below
  - Father Jean-Félix de Hemptinne, O.S.B. (6 August 1910 – 15 March 1932); see above

=== Coadjutor archbishop ===
- Jean-Pierre Tafunga Mbayo, S.D.B. (2008-2010)

=== Auxiliary bishop ===
- Jean-Marie Vianney Musul Masas (since 15 April 2026)

== Suffragan dioceses ==
- Kalemie–Kirungu
- Kamina
- Kilwa–Kasenga
- Kolwezi
- Kongolo
- Manono
- Sakania–Kipushi

== See also ==
- Roman Catholicism in the Democratic Republic of the Congo

== Sources ==
- GCatholic.org
- "Archdiocese of Lubumbashi". Catholic-Hierarchy.org. David M. Cheney.
