= Mathurin Guillemé =

Mgr. Mathurin Guillemé
- Vicar Apostolic of Nyassa
- Installed: 24 February 1911
- Term ended: 27 June 1934
- Predecessor: Joseph Dupont
- Successor: Joseph Ansgarius Julien
- Other post: Titular Bishop of Mathara in Proconsulari (24 February 1911 - 7 April 1942)

Orders
- Ordination: 22 September 1883
- Consecration: Auguste-Léopold Huys by 18 June 1911

Personal details
- Born: 3 July 1859 Sainte Marie-de-Redon, France
- Died: 7 April 1942 (aged 82)

Mathurin Guillemé (3 July 1859 - 7 April 1942) was a Catholic White Fathers missionary who was Vicar Apostolic of Nyassa in today's Malawi from 1911 until his resignation in 1934.

== Early years ==
Mathurin Guillemé was born on 3 July 1859 in Sainte Marie-de-Redon, France. He was a deacon in his home Diocese of Rennes, then was admitted to the White Fathers (Society of Missionaries of Africa) on 22 September 1882. He was ordained a priest of the White Fathers on 22 September 1883. For six months he taught scripture at the novitiate. In March 1884 he left for Zanzibar, where he worked for fifteen months.

On 19 September 1885 Guillemé left Bagamoyo in the missionary caravan of Jean-Baptiste-Frézal Charbonnier, headed by Bishop Léon Livinhac, who was returning to his mission in Buganda. At Kondoa the missionaries met Captain Émile Storms, who was returning to Europe after delivering the stations of Mpala and Karema to the White Fathers. The caravan reached Kipalapala on 12 December 1885, where it rested. On 19 January 1886 Charbonnier and his two companion left for Ujiji. There they embarked on Lake Tanganyika, reaching the mission at Kibanga on the west shore on 19 March 1886.

== Kibanga ==
Kibanga was fortified so it could be defended against the forces of Tippu Tip and Rumaliza, who were constantly raiding the region for slaves. The mission provided a refuge for people fleeing from the slavers. The mission had an orphanage with over 100 children who had been redeemed at the great slave market in Ujiji. It was self-sufficient in food, with the refugees working the fields. Guillemé was to work there for the next three years. Guillemé assisted in obtaining supplies, building, teaching and supervising field work. In 1887 the mission was attacked by slavers who were driven off by gunfire, In 1888 the mission redeemed 162 slaves and baptized 204 people. At the end of that year there were three hundred children in the orphanage.

Charbonnier died at Karema on 16 March 1888. Léonce Bridoux was asked to succeed him as Vicar Apostolic. On 16 January 1889 Guillemé embarked for Ujiji to wait for Bridoux. Bridoux reach Ujiji on 25 January 1889, and the two priests reached Kibanga on 28 January 1889. At the end of April, Bridoux left for Mpala, taking with him Guillemé, who was to head the mission there. Guillemé became a qualified doctor. Around this time Guillemé learned the art of vaccination, which he was to practice for the rest of his life. During a smallpox epidemic in 1908 he personally vaccinated over 1,500 people.

== Mpala ==
The missionaries were reduced to three when Father Moncet died in August 1889. Guillemé as Superior was assisted by Father Herrebaut, while Father Van der Straeten was assigned to the village of Captain Léopold Louis Joubert near Mrumbi, to the south of Mpala. During 1890 and 1891 the intensity of slaving activity increased. Joubert, whose job was to defend the Marungu region surrounding Mpala, took an active role against the slavers. Rumaliza responded by sending an expedition with the goal of eliminating Joubert. On 4 June 1890 Guillemé received a letter from Rumaliza warning that his troops were planning to cross the Lufuko River seeking Joubert, but saying they would not harm the missionaries. The next day however a storm destroyed many of the attackers' boats, and the others withdrew.

Bridoux died of a fever on 20 October 1890. His successor was Adolphe Lechaptois, who made his base at Karema, which he reached on 8 September 1891. From there he visited the missions of Mpala, Mrumbi and Kibanga on the west shore. On 16 October 1891 Captain Alphonse Jacques, head of the Belgian anti-slavery expedition, arrived at Mpala in time to disrupt Rumaliza's plans for another expedition against Joubert. Jacques stayed until Christmas. He left the next day for the north, and established the military base of Albertville near the Lukugo River. By the end of 1891 the threat from the slavers had been seen off. The mission was prospering, and had 300 Christian households and almost 2,000 catechumens.

On 22 February 1892 a caravan arrived at Mpala, led by Bishop Lechaptois. With him were Father Marqués, who had been appointed pro-vicar of the Upper Congo, and two missionaries to reinforce the staff. Marqués died on 11 August 1892, and Guillemé administered the pro-vicariate until Father Victor Roelens arrived in March 1893. In January 1893 Rumaliza was finally defeated and forced to flee. In March 1895 the Upper Congo became an apostolic vicariate, led by Father Roelins. In December 1895 Roelins gave Guillemé responsibility for the vicariate while he visited Belgium. In June 1896 there was a revolt of soldiers to the north of the mission, but Captain Joubert intervened successfully and the mission was not attacked.

Roelins returned to Mpala on 10 September 1897. One of the tasks he set for Guillemé was to exhume the bodies of missionaries who had been buried at Kibanga so they could be reburied in the church at Mpala. Guillemé found that the fields around the former mission that had been cleared with so much effort had completely returned to jungle. On 25 November 1897 Guillemé left Mpala. He crossed the lake to Karema, and then traveled by way of Lake Nyasa to the coast, from where he sailed to Marseilles.

== Later career ==
Guillemé was next assigned to assist Mgr. Joseph Dupont, the Vicar Apostolic of Nyassa, who had to return to Europe for medical attention. Guillemé left Marseilles on 19 May 1899 and arrived at Kayambi on 29 July 1899. He founded in turn missions at Kilonga, Chiwamba, Mua and Kachebere. In January 1905 Guillemé was appointed Visitor of the vicariates of Nyasa, Karema and Upper Congo, and was able to revisit the places where he had worked before in the Congo. Towards the end of 1905 Guillemé was elected to attend the White Fathers general chapter. He left Europe again on 25 July 1906 as regional superior of the vicariates of Nayasa, Karema and Upper Congo.

Bishop Dupont resigned for health reasons in 1911, and the Nyassa vicariate was divided into two. The new Apostolic Vicariate of Bangwelo covered the northern part of what is now Zambia, while the remainder of the Nyassa Vicariate covered northern and central Nyasaland (now Malawi). Father Etienne-Benoît Larue was placed in charge of Bangwelo. On 24 February 1911 Guillemé was appointed Titular Bishop of Mathara in Proconsulari and Vicar Apostolic of Nyassa. He made his base at Bembeke. He was ordained as bishop by Bishop Auguste-Léopold Huys on 18 June 1911.

In February 1915 there was a minor rebellion in which considerable material damage was done. Forty three rebels were captured and three sentenced to death. Guillemé gave evidence at a subsequent commission of inquiry in which he pointed out that none of the rebels had been Catholics. He noted the dangers of distributing bibles too widely, since native teachers could make dangerous interpretations of the teachings in them. Guillemé was always careful to avoid conflict with authority. After World War I he issued instructions to missionaries,

to serve loyally the cause of Government in whose country we live; to remind Christians and even pagans under our influence of the legitimacy and necessity of taxation, and to press them to pay their taxes on time. To show by deeds more than by words that the Catholic missionary is primarily a man of God dedicated to the cure of souls, that he is always and everywhere respectful of lawfully constituted authority, and ready to give all, irrespective of nationality, his dedicated and zealous cooperation.

Guillemé returned to Europe again in 1920 to attend the general chapter of the society. After his return he founded a junior seminary, several new missions and a leprosarium, He introduced use of the local language into primary schools. In 1930 Guillemé was honored as a pioneer of the Congo by King Albert I of Belgium. He later received honors from the governments of Britain and France and from the Pope. He retired on 27 June 1934, but continued to live at a mission in his former vicariate, which was given his name. Mathurin Guillemé died on 7 April 1942 aged eighty-two.
