= Apostolic Vicariate of Tanganyika =

Apostolic Vicariate of Tanganyika Tangankiensis

Location
- Country: Tanzania

Information
- Rite: Latin Rite
- Established: 27 September 1880 – 10 May 1946

The Apostolic Vicariate of Tanganyika was a Catholic apostolic vicariate (missionary pre-diocesan jurisdiction) of the White Fathers missionary order at first centered on the mission of Karema in what is now Tanzania, that included parts of what are now Rwanda, Burundi, Democratic Republic of the Congo, Zambia and Malawi. As the number of missions, schools and converts grew, different regions became distinct vicariates covering portions of the original territory.

== History ==
=== Early years ===
The archbishop of Algeria, Charles Lavigerie, founded the society of Missionaries of Our Lady of Africa of Algeria in 1868. The society came to be known as the "Pères Blancs" or "White Fathers" from the white habits of the missionaries. At first the main activity was to care for Arab orphans in Algeria, but conversion of the people of Central Africa was an objective from the start. Ten missionaries left Algiers in 1878 to establish posts at Lakes Victoria Nyanza and Tanganyika. R.P. Ganachan of the White Fathers penetrated the region of Unyanyembe in 1879, and tried unsuccessfully to settle at Tabora. The White Fathers reached Lake Tanganyika in January 1879, and established a station at Rumonge on the east side of the lake. The Apostolic Vicariate of Tanganyika was established on 27 September 1880 from the Apostolic Vicariate of Central Africa.

The missionaries founded the mission of Mulwewa opposite Rumonge, on the west side of the lake, in the region of Massange in response to an appeal from Massange. The mission was founded by Father Deniaud, the Superior of the Tanganyika mission, with Fathers Moinet and Delaunay, leaving Rumonge on 25 November 1880. In 1891 R.P. Guillet managed to open an orphanage at Tabora, which was soon moved to Kipalapala an hour's walk away. R.P. Lourdel established a post at Djiue-la-Singa in 1894, abandoned on 13 March 1885. On the west shore of Lake Tanganyika the White Fathers founded the stations of Kibanga on 11 June 1883, Mkapakwe on 12 September 1884, Mpala on 8 July 1885 and Baudouinville on 8 May 1893. The local potentate, Rumaliza, tolerated the foundation of the missions at Mulwewa and Kibanga, but prevented establishment of a station at Ujiji, at the extreme northeast of the lake. The mission at Mulwewa was abandoned soon after the acquisition of the stations of Mpala and Karema in 1885.

=== Charbonnier ===
The first Vicar Apostolic of Tanganyika was Jean-Baptiste-Frézal Charbonnier. Charbonnier left Algiers for Tanganyika in October 1884, with a large staff. Charbonnier was stationed at Karema on the east shore of Lake Tanganyika when Captain Léopold Louis Joubert arrived on 22 November 1886, on his way to provide assistance to the station of Mpala on the opposite shore of the lake. Joubert remained there for some months at the request of Charbonnier to protect the mission against attacks by slavers. Charbonnier was formally appointed Vicar Apostolic on 14 January 1887. He was ordained bishop by Bishop Léon Livinhac on 24 August 1887 at Kipalapala, and was the first bishop to be ordained in equatorial Africa.

On 11 January 1887, the Apostolic Vicariate of Unyanyembe was separated from Tanganyika, with Bishop François Gerboin as the first Vicar Apostolic. Unyanyembe consisted of the northern portion of the Vicariate of Tanganyika, including the land around Tabora and extending west to include what is now Burundi. Ujiji remained in the Vicariate of Tanganyika, and what is now Rwanda remained in the Apostolic Vicariate of Southern Victoria Nyanza. On 11 January 1887 the Apostolic Vicariate of Upper Congo was created, containing the missions to the west of Lake Tanganyika. Joubert left for Mpala, now in the Apostolic Vicariate of Upper Congo, in March 1887. Charbonnier had given him full authority as civil and military ruler of the Mpala region. Charbonnier died at Karema on 16 March 1888. Léonce Bridoux was asked to succeed him.

=== Bridoux ===
Bridoux left Marseille on 17 July 1888 destined for Zanzibar accompanied by six missionaries, including Antonin Guillermain. He arrived at the station of Mpala on the west shore of Lake Tanganyika in January 1889. He found a dispute between Father François Coulbois, who had become head of the mission when Charbonnier died, and Léopold Louis Joubert, who was in charge of defense and civil affairs. Coulbois did not recognize that Joubert had civil authority, and had imposed tight restrictions on his actions. Bridoux confirmed that Joubert was both civil and military leader, but said that military operations must be purely defensive. Joubert moved to St Louis de Murumbi, some distance away, to avoid identification of his soldiers with the mission.

In January 1889 the Mpala mission was cut off from the outside world by the Abushiri Revolt against the Germans in Bagamoyo and Dar es Salaam. The mission suffered from repeated and deadly raids. On 31 July 1889 part of the territory was separated as the Apostolic Prefecture of Nyassa. Around the end of May 1890 a group of Arabs prepared to cross the Lukuga River about 100 kilometres (62 mi) to the north of Mpala. Some skirmishing occurred between the Arabs and the mission's African forces before Joubert could reach the scene. The Arabs tried to negotiate with the missionaries, saying they would not harm the mission if the priests abandoned Joubert. Bridoux refused. It seemed that serious fighting was going to break out, when a storm arose that destroyed some of the Arab fleet and forced them to withdraw. Bridoux died on 20 October 1890. He was succeeded by Mgr. Adolphe Lechaptois.

=== Lechaptois ===
On 19 June 1891 Lechaptois was appointed Vicar Apostolic of Tanganyika and Titular Bishop of Utica. He made his base at Karema, which he reached on 8 September 1891. From there he visited the missions of Mpala, Mrumbi and Kibanga on the west shore. The Swahili-Arab slave traders were active in the region, causing great insecurity. The missions could do little except defend themselves, their orphanages and the refugees from the slavers. The Apostolic Vicariate of Upper Congo became independent from Tanganyika in 1892, led by Bishop Victor Roelens. The Apostolic Vicariate of Nyassa became independent from Tanganyika on 12 February 1897, led by Joseph Dupont.

Lechaptois founded the missions of Kala, Zimba, Utinta, Mkulwe and Galula between 1895 and 1901. The German colonial authorities in what was then German East Africa generally supported his efforts, although there were some disputes over the demarcation of areas assigned to the Catholic and Moravian missions. During the first part of the 20th century Lechaptois opened many schools, as well as five orphanages. The training center for catechist-teachers moved several times. eventually settling at Zimba. The center at Karema became a junior seminary, and a major seminary was opened at Utinta. Lechaptois died on 30 November 1917 at Karema. Father Avon administered the vicariate until Joseph-Marie Birraux was named the new Vicar Apostolic.

=== Later history ===
On 18 July 1932 part of the territory was transferred to the Mission sui iuris of Tukuyu, later to become the Diocese of Mbeya. On 10 May 1946 the Vicariate was divided into the Apostolic Vicariate of Karema (now diocese of Sumbawanga) and the Apostolic Vicariate of Kigoma.

== Apostolic Vicars ==
Apostolic Vicars

- Jean-Baptiste-Frézal Charbonnier, M. Afr. (14 January 1887 – 16 March 1888)
- Léonce Bridoux, M. Afr. (15 June 1888 – 20 October 1890)
- Adolphe Lechaptois, M. Afr. (19 June 1891 – 30 November 1917)
- Joseph-Marie Birraux, M. Afr. (22 April 1920 – 22 April 1936)
- Jan Cornelius van Sambeek, M. Afr. (19 November 1936 – 10 May 1946)
