= Mulwewa =

Mulwewa was a mission founded by White Fathers missionaries on the west side of Lake Tanganyika, in what is now the Democratic Republic of the Congo. It is at Massanze, near Uvira.

The White Fathers reached Lake Tanganyika in January 1879, and established a station at Rumonge on the east side of the lake. They founded the mission of Mulwewa opposite Rumonge, on the west side of the lake, in the region of Massange in response to an appeal from Massange. The mission was founded by Father Deniaud, the Superior of the Tanganyika mission, with Fathers Moinet and Delaunay, leaving Rumonge on 25 November 1880. They reached Mulwewa and founded the station on 28 November 1880.

After Deniaud returned, on 1 February 1881 he sent Father Auguste Moncet to replace him at Mulwewa, where Moncet busied himself teaching youth and helping erect the mission buildings. The station was on a narrow plateau that looked over the lake. Mulwewa became a place of refuge for orphans redeemed from slave traders. The priests did not at first build any fortifications. In 1882 Léopold Louis Joubert, a former Papal Zouave, built palisades and moats around the station for protection. He also trained the local people in the use of arms so that they could defend the mission against slavers.

After Mulwewa, the White Fathers founded the stations of Kibanga on 11 June 1883, Mkapakwe on 12 September 1884, Mpala on 8 July 1885 and Baudouinville on 8 May 1893. The local potentate, Rumaliza, tolerated the foundation of the missions at Mulwewa and Kibanga, but prevented establishment of a station at Ujiji, at the extreme northeast of the lake. The mission at Mulwewa was abandoned soon after the acquisition of the stations of Mpala and Karema in 1885. In September 1886 the missionary Mathurin Guillemé visited Mulwewa, finding it in ruins.
