= Adolphe Lechaptois =

Adolphe Lechaptois M. Afr.
- Vicar Apostolic of Tanganyika
- Installed: 19 June 1891
- Term ended: 30 November 1917
- Predecessor: Léonce Bridoux
- Successor: Joseph-Marie Birraux
- Other post: Titular Bishop of Utica (19 June 1891 – 30 November 1917)

Orders
- Ordination: 6 October 1878
- Consecration: 20 May 1894 by Archbishop Prosper Auguste Dusserre

Personal details
- Born: 8 June 1852 Cuillé, France
- Died: 30 November 1917 (aged 65) Karema, Tanganyika

Adolphe Lechaptois, M. Afr. (8 June 1852 – 30 November 1917) was a priest of the White Fathers missionary society who was Vicar Apostolic of Tanganyika from 1891 until his death in 1917, in what is now Tanzania. He took responsibility for the vicariate at a time of great danger, when the missions were insecure havens for people fleeing slavers. As the country settled down, he oversaw expansion in the number of missions and schools. He was the author of a book on the ethnography of the local people that won a prize from the French Société de Géographie.

== Early career ==
Adolphe Lechaptois was born at Cuillé, Mayenne, France on 6 June 1852. He attended the seminary of Laval. In October 1872 he joined the White Fathers (Missionary Society of Africa), and taught for two years at the junior seminary at Algiers since the newly formed society was short of staff. He began his theological studies in November 1875. He was ordained a priest of the White Fathers on 6 October 1878 by Cardinal Charles Lavigerie, the founder of the society. He taught at the junior seminary and was assistant to the master of novices at the society's mother house at Maison Carrée, Algeria. In 1884 he was appointed master of novices. In 1886, he was made regional superior of Kabylie, Algeria. In this position he encouraged the establishment of villages where Christian converts would settle.

== Nyasa ==
East Africa

Cardinal Lavigerie was concerned that the campaign to suppress slavery would cut off the missions around Lake Tanganyika from communication with the coast. He was interested in opening a new supply route from the port of Quelimane in the Portuguese colony of Mozambique via the Zambezi and Shire rivers to Lake Malawi and then on to Lake Tanganyika. At the same time, the Portuguese wanted to gain international recognition of their claim to the territory to the south and west of Lake Nyasa. In June 1889 the White Fathers signed an agreement with the crown of Portugal to set up a mission at the village of chief Mponda, at the southern end of the lake. Lechaptois was chosen to lead the mission, assisted by two other priests, two lay brothers, and two African assistants. One of the lay brothers died in an accident at Zanzibar. The other missionaries reached Quelimane in September 1889, where they learned that the British were claiming jurisdiction over the region to the west and south of the lake.

With considerable difficulty, the missionaries made their way north, reaching Mponda's village on 28 December 1889. The Portuguese withdrew their troops from the Shire and Kololo districts in January 1890, but the White Fathers went ahead with their mission beside Mponda's compound. They had difficulty with Mponda, who was Muslim and a heavy drinker, and used force to maintain his power. The missionary Robert Laws had also had trouble with Mponda. The missionaries provided medical services and taught the local Yao people in their own language, with some success. However, in August 1891 British control over the region was confirmed by an agreement with Portugal. Lavigerie ordered the missionaries to move north towards Tanganyika. Traveling by lake steamer, to the Protestant mission of Livingstonia, then continuing on foot, they eventually reached the village of Nsokolo Chitambi, paramount leader of the Mambwe people, where they rested. Lachaptois continued north alone to the mission of Karema on the east shore of Lake Tanganyika to ask Bishop Léonce Bridoux for permission to set up a mission with the Mambe of Bembaland.

== Congo and Tanganyika ==
Bishop Bridoux died on 20 October 1890. On 19 June 1891 Lechaptois was appointed his successor as Vicar Apostolic of Tanganyika (now the Diocese of Sumbawanga) and Titular Bishop of Utica. He made his base at Karema, which he reached on 8 September 1891. From there he visited the missions of Mpala, Mrumbi and Kibanga on the west shore. The Swahili-Arab slave traders were active in the region, causing great insecurity. The missions could do little except defend themselves, their orphanages, and the refugees from the slavers. The Apostolic Vicariate of Upper Congo was separated from Tanganyika in 1892, led by Bishop Victor Roelens.

Lechaptois returned to France where he took part in the general chapter of the society. He was consecrated bishop on 20 May 1895 by Archbishop Prosper Auguste Dusserre. He returned to Karema in 1895 with the first members of the Missionary Sisters of Our Lady of Africa to work in the region. The Apostolic Vicariate of Nyassa was separated from Tanganyika on 12 February 1897, led by Joseph Dupont. Lechaptois founded the missions of Kala, Zimba, Utinta, Mkulwe, and Galula between 1895 and 1901. The German colonial authorities in what was then German East Africa generally supported his efforts, although there were some disputes over the demarcation of areas assigned to the Catholic and Moravian missions.

During the first part of the 20th century, Lechaptois opened many schools, as well as five orphanages. The training center for catechist-teachers moved several times. eventually settling at Zimba. The center at Karema became a junior seminary, and a major seminary was opened at Utinta. In 1913 Lechaptois published a set of studies of the people of the region based on his observations during twenty years. With obvious sympathy he described the history of the Fipa and Bende people, their politics, family structure, crafts, traditions, art, science, and music. The Geographical Society of Paris awarded him their silver medal for the book.

Lechaptois died on 30 November 1917 at Karema. Father Avon administered the vicariate until Joseph-Marie Birraux was named the new Vicar Apostolic.

== Bibliography ==
- Lechaptois, Adolphe (1913). Aux Rives du Tanganyika. Impr. des Pères Blancs. (ethnography of the people of the region)
