= Kipalapala =

Place in Tabora Region, Tanzania

- Location of St. Paul's Senior Seminary, Kipalapala
- Coordinates: 5.094006°S 32.798792°E
- Country: Tanzania
- Region: Tabora Region
- District: Tabora Urban District
- Ward: Itetemia Ward
- Climate: Aw

Kipalapala is a community in Tanzania close to Tabora. It became the location of a White Fathers mission around 1891, and now contains various Catholic institutions including a senior seminary and a priory. Aim to strengthen youths to be good priests.

== Mission ==
The mission of St. Paul Major Seminary, Kipalapala is to impart academic, religious, moral and human training to young persons who will serve the Catholic Church and the nation as committed priests.

R.P. Ganachan of the White Fathers penetrated the region of Unyanyembe in 1879, and tried unsuccessfully to settle at Tabora. In 1891 R.P. Guillet managed to open an orphanage at Tabora, which was soon moved to Kipalapala an hour's walk away. Jean-Baptiste-Frézal Charbonnier was ordained bishop by Bishop Léon Livinhac on 24 August 1887 at Kipalapala. He was the first bishop to be ordained in equatorial Africa.

== Vision ==
The vision of St. Paul's Major Seminary is a deep evangelization of the local Catholic Church of Tanzania through trained personnel. This evangelization is supposed to lead to an ultimate vision of the Church that is salvation of souls.

== History ==
The official name of Kipalapala Senior Seminary is St. Paul's Senior Seminary - Kipalapala. The seminary was founded by the society of the Missionaries of Africa, popularly known as 'The White Fathers' in 1923. Initially it was located at a small place called Utinta near Lake Tanganyika. Two years later the seminary was shifted to Kipalapala, Tabora, a place which was central and accessible for students who came for priestly formation not only from Tanzania (Tanganyika by then) but also from neighboring countries such as Kenya, Malawi and Zambia. Thus, St. Paul's Senior Seminary at Kipalapala existed since the year 1925. The course in Theology takes four academic years.

Since mid 1960s the seminary became one of the three inter-diocesan regional seminaries in Tanzania assigned to train seminarians in Theology. The other two seminaries for theology are Peramiho Senior Seminary in Southern Tanzania and St. Karoli Lwanga Senior Seminary - Segerea in Dar es Salaam.

== Seminary ==
St. Paul's Senior Seminary is located in Kipalapala. In the years that followed World War I the White Fathers decided that a regional seminary should be founded at Kipalapala to serve the apostolic vicariates of Tabora, Nyassa, Bangwelo and Tanganyika. When the seminary at Rubya was closed in 1929 the seminarians from the Apostolic Vicariate of Mwanza joined the seminary at Kipalapala. The seminaries were threatened by British educational regulations, and to meet them it was decided in 1928 to meet the demands of the colonial administration and conduct classes in English. Bishop Mathurin Guillemé, vicar apostolic of Nyassa, was one of the driving forces in establishing the regional seminary at Kipalapala.

== Other ==
St Bernard's Priory, Kipalapala, Archdiocese of Tabora was founded on 1 January 1984 and raised to Simple Priory on 20 August 1992.
