= Apostolic Vicariate of Unyanyembe =

Apostolic Vicariate of Unyanyembe Vicariatus Apostolicus Unianyembensis Apostolic Vicariate ya Unianyembé

Location
- Country: German East Africa, Tanganyika Territory
- Coordinates: 5°01′S 32°48′E

Information
- First holder: Bishop François Gerboin
- Formation: 28 January 1887
- Denomination: Catholic Church
- Sui iuris church: Latin Church
- Rite: Roman Rite
- Established: 11 January 1887
- Dissolved: 31 May 1925
- Cathedral: St. Theresa’s Metropolitan Cathedral
- Language: Kiswahili
- Apostolic Vicariate of Unyanyembe (Tanzania)

The Vicariate Apostolic of Unyanyembe (Latin: Vicariatus Apostolicus Unianyembensis) was an Apostolic vicariate located in German East Africa. It was promoted to the Diocese of Tabora in 1925 and to the Metropolitan Archdiocese of Tabora in 1953.

== Creation and boundaries ==
It was separated from the Vicariate Apostolic of Nyanza by a Decree of Propaganda on December 30, 1886. Its limits, as fixed on December 10, 1895, were:

- North - the Vicariate Apostolic of Southern Nyanza
- East - a line drawn from Lake Manjara (36°E.) along the mountain ridges to the North West of Ugago
- South - the northern limits of Ujanzi, Ugunda, Ugetta, Uvenza, and Ujiji
- West - Lake Tanganyika and the eastern boundary of the Congo Free State to the village of Ruanda.

== History ==
This district was originally included in the Apostolic Vicariate of Tanganyika. In 1879, R.P. Ganachan of the White Fathers penetrated this previously unknown region and endeavoured to settle at Tabora, but was unsuccessful. Two years later R.P. Guillet succeeded and opened an orphanage there, which was shortly afterwards transferred to Kipalapala one league distant. In 1844 R.P. Lourdel settled at Djiue-la-Singa, but the post was abandoned on 13 March 1885. On 11 January 1887, the mission of Unyanyembe was separated from Tanganika, with R.P. Girault as superior of the provicariate. On 23 August 1887, Mgr Jean Charbonnier was consecrated bishop in the Kipalapala orphanage chapel by Mgr. Léon Livinhac of Uganda. This was the first episcopal consecration in Equatorial Africa. The station at Kipalapala was destroyed in 1889 by the natives. Two years later it was restored, and another was opened at Uchirombo. Towards the close of 1897 five Sisters of Notre-Dame d'Afrique arrived at Uchirombo. In 1900 there were in this mission 20 priests, 6 nuns, 49 catechists, 1842 neophytes, 6000 catechumens, and 150 children in the schools. A German scientist, Dr. Richard Kandt, a Protestant, was so impressed by the good work of the Catholic missionaries that he presented his estate at Tabora to the vicar Apostolic to found a school and hospital. The first vicar Apostolic, Mgr François Gerboin, of the White Fathers, born in 1847 and consecrated titular Bishop of Turbubto in 1897, resided at Ushirombo.

== Mission statistics in 1905 ==
- 33 priests
- 7 lay brothers
- 6 nuns
- 72 catechists
- 26 schools with 966 pupils
- 11 hospitals
- 5 leper houses
- 17 orphanages with 325 children rescued from slavery
- 3,000,000 infidels
- 678 Catholics
- 2889 catechumens.
