= Joseph-Marie Birraux =

Joseph-Marie Birraux M. Afr.
- Superior General of the White Fathers
- Installed: 22 April 1936
- Term ended: 30 April 1947
- Predecessor: Paul Voillard
- Successor: Louis-Marie-Joseph Durrieu
- Other posts: Titular Bishop of Ombi (22 April 1920 - 30 April 1947); Vicar Apostolic of Tanganyika (22 April 1920 - 22 April 1936)

Orders
- Ordination: 28 June 1908
- Consecration: 23 June 1920 by Pierre-Lucien Campistron

Personal details
- Born: 27 November 1883 Bernex, France
- Died: 30 April 1947 (aged 63)

Joseph-Marie Birraux, M. Afr. (27 November 1883 - 30 April 1947) was a Catholic bishop who was Vicar Apostolic of Tanganyika and later became Superior General of the White Fathers, or Society of Missionaries of Africa.

== Early years ==
Joseph-Marie Birraux was born on 27 November 1883 in Bernex, France. He was ordained a priest of the Missionaries of Africa on 28 June 1908. In 1911 he was awarded a doctorate in canon law by the Pontifical Gregorian University in Rome. That year he was assigned to Karema in Tanganyika, where he served as canonical counselor to Adolphe Lechaptois, the Vicar Apostolic.

== Vicar Apostolic of Tanganyika ==
Birraux succeeded Lachaptois in 1920. He was appointed Titular Bishop of Ombi and Vicar Apostolic of Tanganyika (now the Diocese of Sumbawanga) on 22 April 1920. He was ordained as bishop on 23 June 1920 by Bishop Pierre-Lucien Campistron. His achievements as Vicar Apostolic included ordaining the first two African priests in 1923, improving the standard of education of catechists and attempting to make Swahili the standard language of the vicariate. He also tried to make the church less dependent on external sources for funding by introducing a tax on church members. Birraux was succeeded as Vicar Apostolic of Tanganyika by Jan Cornelius van Sambeek.

== Superior General of the White Fathers ==
On 22 April 1936 Birraux was elected Superior General of the White Fathers. He succeeded Bishop Paul Voillard. In his first years Birraux visited White Fathers locations in Europe and Canada, and in Algeria, Tunisia, Sahara, West Africa and the Gold Coast (now Ghana). He reorganized the White Fathers into provinces aligned with national borders. In 1939 the Tanganyikan missions of Mbulu and Turu were ceded to the Pallottines.

During World War II Birraux was opposed to the armistice between France and Germany. Despite the difficulties, from his base in Algiers he maintained contact with members of the society in France, Italy, Belgium and the Netherlands, and also with missions in French Africa. Apart from Cameroon, Congo-Brazzaville, Gabon and Chad, all the French colonies in Africa remained loyal to Marshall Pétain's right-wing and pro-Catholic Vichy regime rather than that of General Charles de Gaulle in London. General Weygand visited Birraux in Algiers in 1941 and gained assurance that he would support the Vichy regime. In 1943 the White Fathers assumed responsibility for the mission in Oyo, Nigeria. In 1946 the society assumed responsibility for the mission in Beira, Mozambique.

Birraux suffered from hypertension, and required treatment several times during the war years. He underwent surgery twice in 1945. He died from a cerebral hemorrhage on 30 April 1947. He was succeeded as Superior General by Bishop Louis-Marie-Joseph Durrieu.
