= Pacandus =

Pacandus was considered a Roman Catholic Titular bishopric, recorded, using its adjectival form Pacanden(sis) in the list of such sees as late as 1884, when it was suppressed as never having existed as a residential see. One holder of the title was Léon Livinhac, superior general of the White Fathers.

The name of "Pacandus" owes its origin, without doubt, to the bishopric of Acanda in Lycia (Asia Minor), whose bishop, Panaetius, signed in 458 the letter of the bishops of Lycia to Emperor Leo I, and which is mentioned in the Notitiae Episcopatuum from the seventh to the thirteenth century among the suffragans of Myra. Its exact site is unknown.

Neither "Pacandus" nor "Acandus" is included in the current list of titular sees recognized by the Catholic Church.
