= Moto Moto Museum =

Geography
- Location: Mbala, Zambia
- Coordinates: 8°50′S 31°28′E

The Moto Moto Museum is a museum in Mbala, Zambia, housing a collection of artifacts related to Zambian culture, first collected by Canadian priest Jean Jacques Corbeil in the 1940s. The artifacts, collected for study and posterity by Cornbeil, were stored in the Mulilansolo Mission until 1964, when they were moved to Serenje, Zambia until 1969, then to Isoka. The current site, a former carpentry and bricklaying workshop, was donated by the Diocese of Mbala in 1972, to serve as a museum. When it opened in 1974, it took its name from the French Catholic Bishop Joseph Dupont's nickname Moto Moto (because he was often smoking his pipe and "moto" means "hot"). Dupont founded the White Fathers missionary in northern Zambia, where he worked from 1885 to 1911.
