= Apostolic Vicariate of Bangueolo =

Apostolic Vicariate of Bangueolo de Bangueolo

Location
- Country: Zambia
- Coordinates: 10.208°S 31.184°E

Information
- Denomination: Catholic
- Rite: Latin Rite
- Established: 28 January 1913 - 10 July 1952

The Apostolic Vicariate of Bangueolo was a vicariate established by the Catholic White Fathers missionary society in 1913 located in what is now Zambia. The name "Bangueolo" derives from the Bangweulu region of northern Zambia, which formed the core of its territory.

== Origins ==
The Apostolic Vicariate of Bangueolo has its origins in the White Fathers mission at Mambwe Mwela, 100 kilometres (62 mi) to the east of Mbala, established in 1891. The missionaries moved to Kayambi in 1895. In 1897 the Apostolic Vicariate of Nyassa was separated from the Apostolic Vicariate of Tanganyika, covering what is now Malawi and the north and east of Zambia. Bishop Joseph Dupont was the first Vicar Apostolic of Nyassa. On 28 January 1913 the Apostolic Vicariate of Bangueolo was separated from Nyassa.

== History ==
The new vicariate of Bangweulu covered the Northern and Luapula Regions, while the south east part kept the name Nyassa. On 28 January 1913 Bishop Etienne-Benoît Larue was consecrated as the first Vicar Apostolic. In 1913 the Bangweulu vicariate had six mission stations, twenty five priests, eight White Sisters and six lay brothers. There were 246 catechists and 5,800 baptized Christians. The vicariate bordered German East Africa. It became a war zone when World War II (1914-1918) started. The population suffered from food requisitions, taxes and forced levies of men to act as porters and to do other war-related work. Missionaries were called up to work in the hospitals or as chaplains with the troops.

On 23 May 1933 the northeast was separated as the Mission Sui Juris of Lwangwa, administered by Fr. Jan Cornelius van Sambeek. On 5 October 1935 Bishop Larue died and was succeeded by Bishop Alexandre-Auguste-Laurent-Marie Roy. On 10 March 1949 Mgr. Alexander Roy resigned as Vicar Apostolic and was succeeded by Marcel Daubechies.

On 10 July 1952 the western part of the vicariate became Apostolic Prefecture of Fort Rosebery (Mansa), while the eastern part became the Apostolic Vicariate of Kasama. Marcel Daubechies remained as Vicar Apostolic of Kasama.
