= Jean Jacques Corbeil =

Father Jean Jacques Corbeil was a French Canadian Roman Catholic missionary who collected and documented musical instruments of Zambia's Bemba people during the middle of the twentieth century. He published a book with photos and brief descriptions. Part of his collection is now housed at the University of Zambia Library, but due to lack of funds is in poor condition. Father Corbeil established the Moto Moto Museum at Mbala named in remembrance of Bishop Joseph 'Moto Moto' Dupont to preserve archeological, traditional and historical artifacts.
