= Adrien Atiman =

African Catholic catechist and medical doctor

Adrien Atiman (c. 1866–1956) was a Catholic catechist and medical doctor.

== Early life ==
Atiman was born in Tindirma, French Sudan, on the Niger River. He belonged to the Songhai ethnic group and was captured at a young age by members of the Tuareg, who sold him as a slave in Timbuktu. He passed through different hands before arriving in Metlili, Southern Algeria, where he was ransomed by the Missionaries of Africa, or White Fathers, who sent him to school in Algeria and Tunisia. Cardinal Lavigerie, archbishop of Carthage and Algiers, was impressed by Atiman's performance and arranged for him to study medicine at the University of Malta.

== Career ==
In 1888, Atiman left on a mission with the White Fathers for Karema, on the shore of Lake Tanganyika, where he arrived in 1889. Karema was a new mission station on land recently transferred from the Congo Free State to German East Africa. Here he established himself as a medical catechist, or médecin-catéchiste. He married the daughter of the chief Wabende and had a son called Joseph. He frequently travelled to Kigoma and Albertville, where he could consult with other doctors in order to keep his medical knowledge up to date, as well as making long circuits through the countryside to provide medical aid in the villages. He was awarded four British decorations, including the Royal African Society's Wellcome Medal, and received three Belgian awards for care given to colonial troops during World War I between 1916 and 1918. In recognition of his career, Pope Pius XII appointed him a Knight-Commander of the Order of St. Sylvester.

== Death ==
Atiman died in Karema at the age of more than 90, on 24 April 1956. He left a significant autobiographical account of his enslavement, subsequent freedom and integration into the White Fathers' mission.
