= Jan Cornelius van Sambeek =

Dutch missionary (1886–1966)

The Right Reverend Jan Cornelius van Sambeek, M.Afr.
- Bishop Emeritus of Kigoma
- Diocese: Kigoma
- Installed: 25 March 1953
- Term ended: 22 November 1957
- Successor: James Holmes-Siedle, M.Afr.
- Other posts: Titular Bishop of Tracula (22 November 1957 – 25 December 1966); Vicar Apostolic of Kigoma (10 May 1946 – 25 March 1953); Titular Bishop of Gergis (19 November 1936 – 25 March 1953); Vicar Apostolic of Tanganyika (19 November 1936 – 10 May 1946)

Orders
- Ordination: 29 June 1911
- Consecration: 7 May 1937 by Anton Oomen, M.Afr.

Personal details
- Born: 23 April 1886 Veldhoven, North Brabant, Netherlands
- Died: 25 December 1966 (aged 80) Kabanga, Kigoma Region, Tanzania

Jan Cornelius van Sambeek, M.Afr. (or John van Sambeek) was a Dutch White Fathers missionary who was the Vicar Apostolic of Tanganyika (1936–1946), and then Bishop of Kigoma (1946–1957), in the former British-administered Tanganyika Territory, now Tanzania.

== Early years ==
Jan Cornelius van Sambeek was born on 23 April 1886 at Veldhoven, Netherlands. He came from a family of ten. One of his sisters became a nun, and three of his brothers became priests. He studied Theology at Carthage in Tunisia. On 29 June 1911 he was ordained a priest of the White Fathers (Society of Missionaries of Africa). He remained in the Netherlands during World War I (1914–1918).

== Missionary ==
In 1919 van Sambeek was assigned to the Chilubula mission in the Apostolic Vicariate of Bangweolo, in Northern Rhodesia, now Zambia. For the next twelve years he worked with the government in developing Catholic schools. He threw himself into the work with great energy and enthusiasm. He opened the Teacher Training College of Rosa in 1927, and became the college's first principal. He was later made Education Secretary for the diocese. He wrote a number of school books including Ifya Bukaya, which is still in use today. He had an extraordinary aptitude for languages, and wrote many books in the Bemba language covering a range of subjects.

Van Sambeek visited the copperbelt for two weeks in 1929 with Fr. Louis Etienne. He recommended a separate mission to support the miners, but this was not accepted. In 1932 he took home leave, following which he was made Prefect Apostolic of Tukuyu in Tanganyika. There he prepared a Nyakyusa dictionary and a Safwa grammar. He returned to Northern Rhodesia in December 1933 as Administrator of the new Mission Sui Juris of Lwangwa. In 1934 he founded the Ilondola (Maria Magdalena de Puzzi) mission in Chinsali District and the Chalabesa (St. Joseph) mission among the Bisa in the Mpika District. In 1936 he established the missions of Katibunga, Christ the King (Mpika) and Mulilansolo near Isoka and St. John the Apostle, (Chinsali).

== Vicar Apostolic and bishop ==
Van Sambeek was appointed Titular Bishop of Gergis and Vicar Apostolic of Tanganyika (now the Diocese of Sumbawanga). on 19 November 1936. On 7 May 1937 he was ordained bishop by Bishop Anton Oomen. On 10 May 1946 the Apostolic Vicariate of Kigoma was formed from part of the Apostolic Vicariate of Tanganyika. Van Sambeek kept the less-developed northern Buha region of the diocese. He was appointed Vicar Apostolic of Kigoma. On 25 March 1953 the Apostolic Vicariate was promoted to the Diocese of Kigoma. Van Sambeek was appointed Bishop of Kigoma, holding this position until he resigned on 22 November 1957. As bishop he translated many Christian works into the Ha language, and wrote a book on local customs.

When van Sambeek resigned he was made Titular Bishop of Tracula. He remained in the diocese, dying in Kabanga on 25 December 1966.
