= Léonce Bridoux =

Léonce Bridoux M. Afr.
- Vicar Apostolic of Tanganyika
- Installed: 15 June 1888
- Term ended: 20 October 1890
- Predecessor: Jean-Baptiste-Frézal Charbonnier
- Successor: Adolphe Lechaptois
- Other post: Titular Bishop of Utica (15 June 1888 - 20 October 1890)

Orders
- Ordination: 24 October 1874
- Consecration: 8 July 1888 by Cardinal Charles Lavigerie

Personal details
- Born: 15 January 1852 Henin-Liétard, France
- Died: 20 October 1890 (aged 38) Tanganyika

Léonce Bridoux, M. Afr. (15 January 1852 – 20 October 1890) was a Catholic missionary of the White Fathers who became the Vicar Apostolic of Tanganyika.

== Early years ==
Léonce Bridoux was born on 15 January 1852 in Henin-Liétard, France. His father was Sub Saharan African and his mother was French.

He joined the White Fathers (Society of the Missionaries of Africa) in 1873.On 24 October 1874 he was ordained a priest of the White Fathers. Bridoux became Superior of the Major seminary of Carthage in Tunisia.

== Brothers in arms ==
Charles Lavigerie, the founder of the White Fathers in 1868 and the White Sisters in 1869, had great influence on missionary activity in Africa. He came to believe that an African Catholic kingdom should be founded in the east of Central Africa as a refuge for escaped slaves and a center for converting the surrounding peoples. In May 1883 a mission head proposed the idea of brothers who would train the converts to defend their missions, as an alternative to hiring mercenaries. Bridoux was asked to review the rules of orders such as the old Knights of Malta, and in his report he proposed that brothers-in-arms should be employed for defense, under the direction of the Fathers. Lavigerie began thinking of directly using the knights of the Order of Malta. However, he was not able to get support from the grand master and the idea was abandoned.

== Bishop ==
Bridoux was asked to succeed Bishop Jean-Baptiste-Frézal Charbonnier, who died at Karema in Tanganyika on 16 March 1888. He was appointed Titular Bishop of Utica and Vicar Apostolic of Tanganyika (now the Diocese of Sumbawanga) on 15 June 1888. He was ordained as bishop on 8 July 1888 by Cardinal Lavigerie in the chapel of the nuns of Zion in Paris. Bridoux left Marseille on 17 July 1888 destined for Zanzibar accompanied by six missionaries, including Antonin Guillermain.

Bridoux arrived at the station of Mpala on the west shore of Lake Tanganyika in January 1889. He found a dispute in progress between Father François Coulbois, who had become head of the mission when Charbonnier died, and Léopold Louis Joubert, who was in charge of defense and civil affairs. Coulbois did not recognize that Joubert had civil authority, and had imposed tight restrictions on his actions. Bridoux confirmed that Joubert was both civil and military leader, but said that military operations must be purely defensive. Joubert moved to St Louis de Murumbi, some distance away, to avoid identification of his soldiers with the mission.

In January 1889 the Mpala mission was cut off from the outside world by the Abushiri Revolt against the Germans in Bagamoyo and Dar es Salaam. The mission suffered from repeated and deadly raids. Around the end of May 1890 a group of Arabs prepared to cross the Lukuga River about 100 kilometres (62 mi) to the north of Mpala. Some skirmishing occurred between the Arabs and the mission's African forces before Joubert could reach the scene. The Arabs tried to negotiate with the missionaries, saying they would not harm the mission if the priests abandoned Joubert. Bridoux refused. It seemed that serious fighting was going to break out, when a storm arose that destroyed some of the Arab fleet and forced them to withdraw.

Bridoux died on 20 October 1890.
