= Cuillé =

- Commune
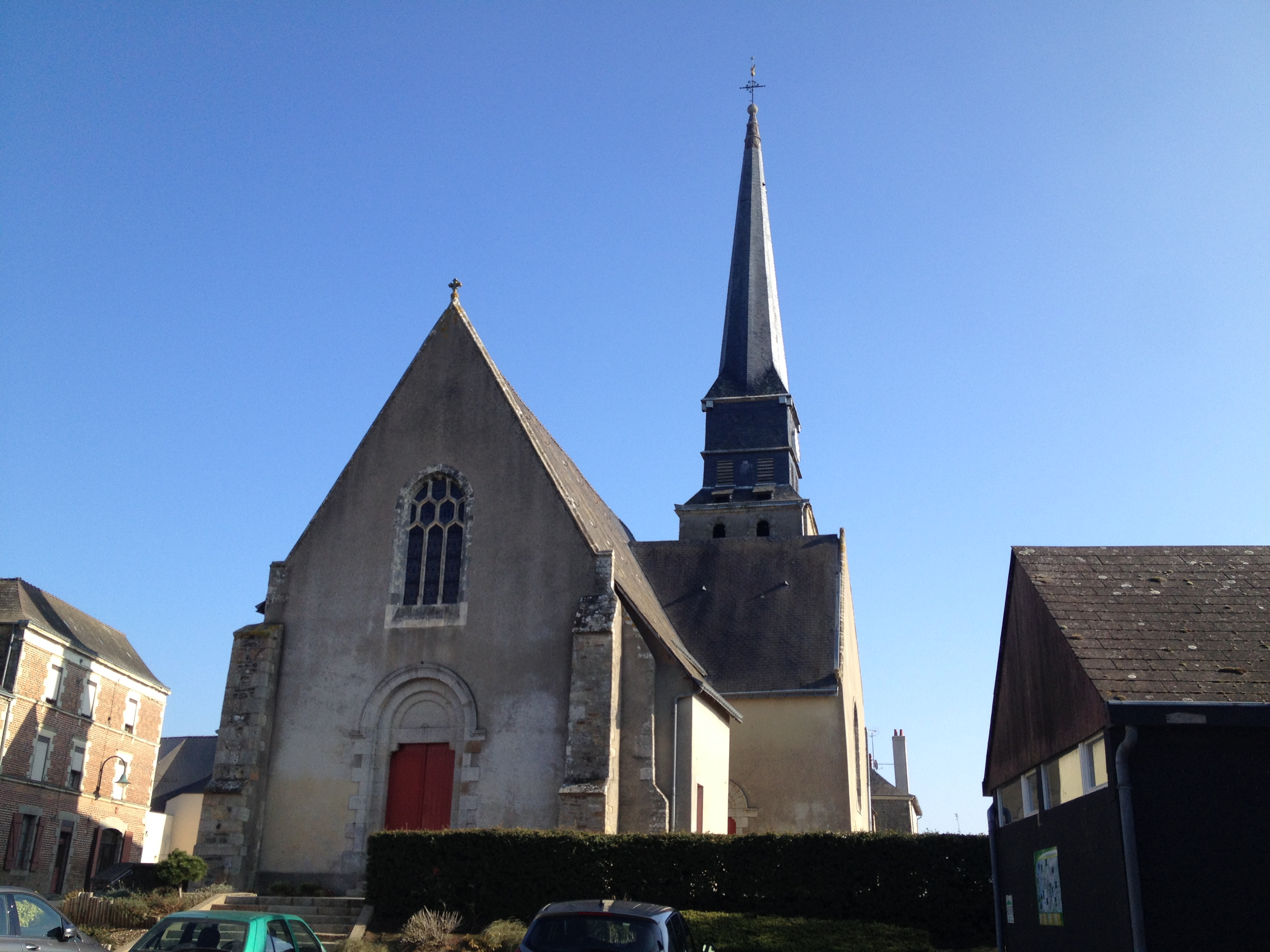
- The church of Saint-Martin
- Location of Cuillé
- Location within France Location within Pays de la Loire
- Coordinates: 47°58′18″N 1°07′03″W
- Country: France
- Region: Pays de la Loire
- Department: Mayenne
- Arrondissement: Château-Gontier
- Canton: Cossé-le-Vivien

Government
  - Mayor (2020–2026): Marie-Noëlle Hincelin
- Area^{1}: 21.66 km^{2} (8.36 sq mi)
- Elevation: 100 m (330 ft)
- Highest elevation: 103 m (338 ft)
- Lowest elevation: 57 m (187 ft)
- Population (2023): 888
  - Density: 41.0/km^{2} (106/sq mi)
- Time zone: UTC+01:00 (CET)
  - Summer (DST): UTC+02:00 (CEST)
- INSEE/Postal code: 53088 /53540
- ^{1} French Land Register data, which excludes lakes, ponds, glaciers > 1 km^{2} (0.386 sq mi or 247 acres) and river estuaries.

Cuillé (French pronunciation: [kɥije]) is a commune in the Mayenne department in north-western France.

== See also ==
- Communes of the Mayenne department
