= Kibanga =

- Location within Democratic Republic of the Congo
- Coordinates: 4.48865°S 29.16794°E
- Country: Democratic Republic of the Congo
- Province: South Kivu
- Territory: Fizi Territory

Kibanga, formerly called Lavigerieville, is a settlement in the South Kivu province of the Democratic Republic of the Congo.

The White Fathers founded the first mission station on the west of the lake at Mulweba in 1880, and founded the mission at Kibanga, slightly further south on the lakeshore, in June 1883. Kibanga is located to the south of the Ubwari Peninsula, on the west side of Lake Tanganyika. The local potentate, Rumaliza, tolerated the foundation of the missions at Mulwewa and Kibanga, but prevented establishment of a station at Ujiji, at the extreme northeast of the lake.

Léopold Louis Joubert, a former Papal Zouave, reached Kibanga on 10 June 1883. There he oversaw construction of a fortified mission for the White Fathers missionaries, called Lavigerieville after the society's founder Cardinal Charles Lavigerie. The mission was besieged by slave traders for three weeks. At first all the missionaries were French, but in January 1884 the Flemish missionary Amaat Vyncke arrived at Kibanga. The lingua-franca of the region was Swahili, but Vyncke decided that the mission would be more effective if the missionaries spoke the local languages.

Rumaliza had established several posts for his slavers around Kibanga. According to mission records, in 1886 Ubwari had three villages with a total of 4,000 people. By 1888 there were 2,000 people at the mission, many of them refugees who had adopted Christianity, including 200 adults who had been redeemed from slavery. An orphanage housed 300 slave children. In January 1889 Rumaliza claimed that he had prevented an attack on Kibanga. By 1891, two of the neighboring villages had 900 people between them, and the third was not mentioned. 1,200 people had moved to the protection of the mission.
