= Jean-Baptiste-Frézal Charbonnier =

Jean-Baptiste-Frézal Charbonnier M. Afr.
- Vicar Apostolic of Tanganyika
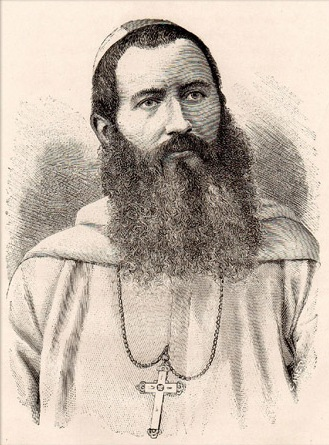
- Installed: 14 January 1887
- Term ended: 16 March 1888
- Successor: Léonce Bridoux
- Other post: Titular Bishop of Utica (14 January 1887 - 16 March 1888)

Orders
- Consecration: by Bishop Léon-Antoine-Augustin-Siméon Livinhac

Personal details
- Born: 20 May 1842 La Canourgue, France
- Died: 16 March 1888 (aged 45) Karema, Tanganyika

Jean-Baptiste-Frézal Charbonnier, M.Afr. (20 May 1842 – 16 March 1888) was a Catholic White Fathers missionary who was Vicar Apostolic of Tanganyika from January 1887 to March 1888.

Jean-Baptiste-Frézal Charbonnier was born on 20 May 1842 in La Canourgue, France. He was ordained a priest of the White Fathers (Society of the Missionaries of Africa) on 22 May 1869. On 3 October 1884 the Missions Catholiques announced that it was proposed to consecrate Charbonnier, former principal of the missionary training college at Algiers, as Bishop and Vicar Apostolic of Tanganyika. Léon Livinhac had already been consecrated as Bishop and Vicar Apostolic of Nyanza on 16 September 1884. The two were to set out for their dioceses with a large staff.

Charbonnier was stationed at Karema on the east shore of Lake Tanganyika when the French soldier Captain Léopold Louis Joubert arrived on 22 November 1886, on his way to provide assistance to the station of Mpala on the opposite shore of the lake. Joubert remained there for some months at the request of Charbonnier to protect the mission against attacks by slavers. On 14 January 1887 Charbonnier was appointed Titular Bishop of Utica and Vicar Apostolic of Tanganyika (now the Diocese of Sumbawanga). Joubert left for Mpala in March 1887. Charbonnier had given him full authority as civil and military ruler of the Mpala region. Charbonnier was ordained bishop by his friend Bishop Léon Livinhac on 24 August 1887 at Kipalapala. He was the first bishop to be ordained in equatorial Africa.

Charbonnier died at Karema on 16 March 1888. Léonce Bridoux was asked to succeed him.
