= Joseph Dupont (bishop) =

French Roman Catholic missionary bishop (1850–1930)

Joseph-Marie-Stanislas Dupont M. Afr.
- Vicar Apostolic of Nyassa
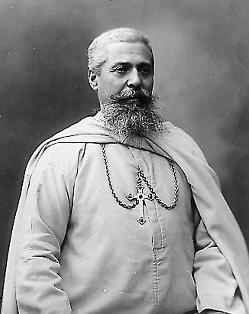
- Installed: 16 February 1897
- Term ended: 28 February 1911
- Successor: Mathurin Guillemé
- Other post: Titular Bishop of Thibaris (16 February 1897 – 19 March 1930)

Orders
- Ordination: 21 December 1878
- Consecration: 15 August 1897 by Bishop Adolphe Lechaptois

Personal details
- Born: 23 July 1850 Gesté, Maine et Loire
- Died: 19 March 1930 (aged 79) Thibar, Tunisia

Joseph-Marie-Stanislas Dupont (23 July 1850 – 19 March 1930), nicknamed Moto Moto ('fire fire') by the Bemba people was a French Catholic missionary bishop, who was a pioneer in Zambia's Northern Province (then part of North-Eastern Rhodesia) from 1885 to 1911. He persuaded the Bemba, feared by the Europeans colonizers and by neighbouring tribes, to allow him to become the first missionary into their territory around Kasama. At the time the British South Africa Company (BSAC) chartered by Britain to administer North-Eastern Rhodesia was not in control of all the territory.

== Origins ==
Dupont was born in Maine et Loire, on 23 July 1850 to a peasant family. After a short and quite successful military service, he decided to become a member of the White Fathers missionary society, now called the Society of the Missionaries of Africa. He was ordained a priest on 21 December 1878, and took his oath as a member of the White Fathers the following year. He was then sent to teach at the College of Saint-Louis of Carthage at Thibar in the French protectorate of Tunisia, now in the Béja Governorate. He was later sent to the Karema Mission on Lake Tanganyika in 1892.

== Early years in Africa ==
The White Fathers had arrived at Mponda, west of Lake Nyasa, in 1885, and in 1891 had moved up the Stevenson Road which had been built to connect Nyasa with Lake Tanganyika, stopping at Mambwe Mwela. They attempted to set up in Bemba lands but the Paramount Chief of the Bemba, the Chitimukulu, was fiercely opposed to any incursion by missionaries. When Dupont arrived at Mambwe in 1895 he found that some of the independently minded Bemba Senior Chiefs were not opposed, and one of them, Makasa at Kayambi, gave Dupont a foothold in his area in 1895. Dupont tried to expand into the Bemba heartland and though gaining favour from many of the chiefs, was still opposed by the Chitimukulu.

A story goes that one day the Chitimukulu (XXVII Sampa Kapalakasha) sent two warriors armed with bows and arrows to kill Dupont, and they hid to ambush him where he used to shoot guinea fowl. Suddenly a bird burst from the bush and Dupont hit it with a single shot and it landed almost on the head of one of the warriors. This put them in such awe of his power that they stayed hidden and did nothing.

In 1897 Dupont was appointed the first Vicar Apostolic of Nyassa, which covered today's Malawi and the whole northern half of present-day Zambia. He was consecrated the Titular bishop of Thibaris on 15 August 1897 by Bishop Adolphe Le Chaptois, M. Afr.

There are several versions of the origin of the nickname 'Moto Moto' (fire fire). One is that it was in recognition of his energy, another that Dupont smoked a pipe and was constantly calling for a light, another was that it was a Chewa war cry from the Nyasa area, another, more unlikely, that he had an early kind of motorbike.

== The Chieftainship succession crisis ==
In 1896 Chitimukulu XXVII Sampa Kapalakasha died and the title remained vacant while the succession was worked out. Dupont tried to get permission from the most powerful Senior Chief, Mwamba III at Milungu, to expand the mission but was rejected. However, in 1898 Chief Mwamba fell ill and sent for Dupont, who had some medical skills and a reputation for healing. Before the chief died the next year he and his council were sufficiently impressed by Dupont's help they asked him to succeed as chief. This provoked a crisis because, firstly, the coronation of a new chief required human sacrifice, and, secondly, a Bemba civil war threatened over the succession of the Chitimukulu. At first Dupont, who had become very knowledgeable about Bemba culture and traditions, agreed to act as chief to forestall trouble, joking that he should take on Chief Mwamba's wives. Meanwhile, he gathered support from the 33 subordinate Bemba chiefs for his next action.

== British control of the Bemba ==
To avoid bloodshed Dupont asked the BSAC administration based in Fort Jameson to take control of the Bemba lands. On 3 November 1898 the BSAC sent Charles MacKinnon and R.A. 'Bobo' Young from Mbala with a force which did the job and paved the way for a new Chitimukulu and Chief Mwamba to be installed and eventually led to a BSAC boma being based in Kasama.

Despite the fact that this must have been one of the few occasions in history when a Frenchman pushed a territory into the British Empire, MacKinnon in particular was opposed to Dupont's presence in the country, not only because of the strife which it caused with the Chitimukulu, but also because Protestant missionaries of the London Missionary Society had set up in Mackinnon's district of Mbala and there were some rivalries with the Catholic White Fathers. To Dupont's amazement Mackinnon told him that he had no permission to remain there, according to orders of the new Administrator, Robert Codrington. Dupont protested that it was he who had opened up the Bemba to British control, and he stayed put. Codrington accepted the reality of the situation, and as a gesture of reconciliation and gratitude invited Dupont to sit beside him at the installation of the next chief in 1899.

== 1900–1930 ==
In 1899 Dupont founded the Chilubula Mission enclave, which still stands today near Kayambi. Later he had some quarrels with colleagues who found his discipline too military and who felt he devoted to much attention to the Bemba and not enough to many other groups living in the huge area of the Vicariate.

Dupont resigned his office on 28 February 1911 and left for Thibar in Tunisia where the White Fathers had a retirement home, and where he died in 1930 and was buried. His remains were re-buried at the church he had built at Chilubula at a ceremony on 15 December 2000.

The Moto Moto Museum in Mbala is named in his honour.
