= Léon Livinhac =

Léon-Antoine-Augustin-Siméon Livinhac M. Afr.
- Superior General of Missionaries of Africa (1890-1922)
- Installed: 26 November 1892
- Term ended: 12 November 1922
- Predecessor: Charles Lavigerie
- Successor: Paul Voillard
- Other posts: Titular Archbishop of Oxyrynchus (21 November 1921 - 12 November 1922); Titular Bishop of Pacandus (15 Jun 1883 - 21 November 1921); Vicar Apostolic of Victoria-Nyanza (15 Jun 1883 - 4 December 1889),

Orders
- Ordination: 12 October 1873 by Charles Lavigerie
- Consecration: 14 September 1884 by Charles Lavigerie

Personal details
- Born: 13 July 1846 Buzeins, France
- Died: 12 November 1922 (aged 76) Maison-Carrée, Algeria
- Denomination: Catholic

Léon-Antoine-Augustin-Siméon Livinhac, M.Afr. (13 July 1846 – 12 November 1922) was a Catholic priest who established the church in what is modern Uganda and became head of the White Fathers (Society of the Missionaries of Africa). He oversaw a major expansion of the missionary society that coincided with the European colonial annexation of most of Africa.

== Birth and education ==
Léon Livinhac was born on 13 July 1846 in the parish of Buzeins in the Aveyron department of the south of France, one of three children of a farmer. His father, Antoine Simon Livinhac, died when he was two years old. His mother, Marie Aimée, died when he was five. He was raised by his grandmother and his aunts. He suffered from poor health as a child, but was an excellent and industrious scholar. He attended primary school at Saint-Geniez-d'Olt from 1855 to 1860, then entered Saint Denis, the diocesan college at Saint Geniez. He entered the Sulpician major seminary of Rodez in October 1867, received the tonsure in May 1869, minor orders in June 1870 and was ordained to the diaconate in May 1872.

== Early career ==
In February 1873 Livinhac applied to Archbishop Charles Lavigerie, the founder and head of the Society of the Missionaries of Africa. He began his novitiate at the White Fathers house at Maison Carrée, near Algiers, in April 1873. Archbishop Lavigerie ordained him as a priest of the White Fathers on 12 October 1873. Although he had not completed his novitiate, he was immediately appointed vice-rector, bursar and professor of dogmatic theology of the White Fathers' major seminary, the scholasticate. On 7 April 1874 he took his oath as a missionary, and on 12 October 1874 was elected as a member of the society's General Council. At that time there were 43 fathers and 9 brothers in the society. His first missionary appointment was in February 1875 in Kabylie, to the east of Algiers. The missionaries had to act with great care, since the French colonial authorities were deeply suspicious of proselytizing activity that could disturb the peace. In August 1875 he was recalled to become rector of the scholasticate.

== Victoria-Nyanza ==
In March 1878 Livinhac was made leader of the first Catholic missionary expedition to equatorial Africa. The group of ten missionaries left Algiers on 21 April 1878 and reached Uganda on 17 February 1879. They were based on the shore of Lake Victoria, but traveled widely in the region by foot or by dugout canoe. Livinhac and other missionaries established the church in Buganda, part of modern Uganda. Livinhac studied the local Luganda language, and prepared a dictionary and a grammar.

Conditions in Buganda were unsettled due to the presence of Arabs from the north and European colonists pushing in from the east coast. In 1883 Livinhac moved to the less disturbed location of Bukumbi, to the south of the lake. On 15 June 1883 he was appointed titular bishop of Pacandus and vicar apostolic of Victoria-Nyanza. He returned to Maison Carrée, and on 14 September 1884 was ordained as bishop by Archbishop Lavigerie.

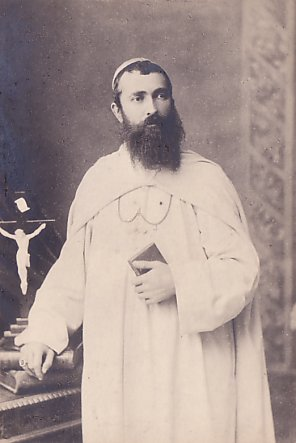
Bishop Livinhac in 1885.

Livinhac's appointment as bishop created a dual reporting structure. The White Fathers retained the authority to demand that the priests obeyed the society's rules in their religious life, but the bishop was responsible to the Vatican's Sacred Congregation for the Propagation of the Faith for the conduct of the priests in carrying out their missions.

Livinhac returned to Victoria-Nyanza in May 1885 to find that conditions in Buganda had deteriorated. He visited Buganda in 1886, and was present when the Uganda Martyrs were executed by King Mwanga II of Buganda. Livinhac reached the Bugandan capital in May 1886, at a time when forty Christian converts had been imprisoned by the king under sentence of death but not yet killed. The Protestant missionaries proposed to combine with the Catholics in an attempt to intervene and save their lives. Livinhac declined, saying he was concerned that would make matters worse. After this he made only two short visits to Buganda in 1888 and 1890. In September 1889 he was elected Superior General of the society. He ordained his successor John Joseph Hirth on 25 May 1890 at Kamoga, and returned to France. He reached Marseilles on 19 September 1890.

== Superior-General ==
Livinhac attended the Anti-Slavery Congress in Paris in September 1890, then visited the Vatican, accompanied by fourteen Baganda who had come with him to France. He was installed as Superior General on 5 November 1890. His first two years were difficult, since Lavigerie continued to be actively involved in decisions. Livinhac had to take responsibility without seeming to be seeking power. He only assumed full responsibility for the society after Archbishop Lavigerie died on 26 November 1892. He was reelected in 1894 and 1900. In 1906 he was elected Superior General for life. Livinhac was appointed Titular Archbishop of Oxyrynchus on 21 November 1921.

As superior of the society, Livinhac based himself in the complex of buildings at Maison-Carrée that the missionaries called the Mother House (Maison-Mère). During his term of office the European colonial powers established control throughout Africa. The society had to deal with tensions between the church and the colonial authorities, and had to recruit missionaries with the same nationality as the local colonial power. From 1892 to 1922 the society grew from three bishops to sixteen, and from 185 fathers and 64 brothers to 674 fathers and 180 brothers. Livinhac defined a constitution for the society, wrote many circulars giving direction to the missionaries, and sponsored publication of several magazines.

Livinhac died at Maison-Carree on 11 November 1922, at the age of 76. He was an extremely modest man, always willing to admit his own weaknesses, but at the same time energetic and capable of projecting his authority. He was always completely loyal to Lavigerie, whom he came close to venerating, and remained true to the principles and objectives of the founder of the society throughout his long administration.

== Read also ==
- ArchBishop Livinhac (1846-1922)
- The White Fathers Mission in Uganda

== Bibliography ==
- Livinhac, Léon; Charbonnier, Jean Baptiste (1886). Près des grands lacs. Missions catholiques.
