= Karema, Tanzania =

Karema
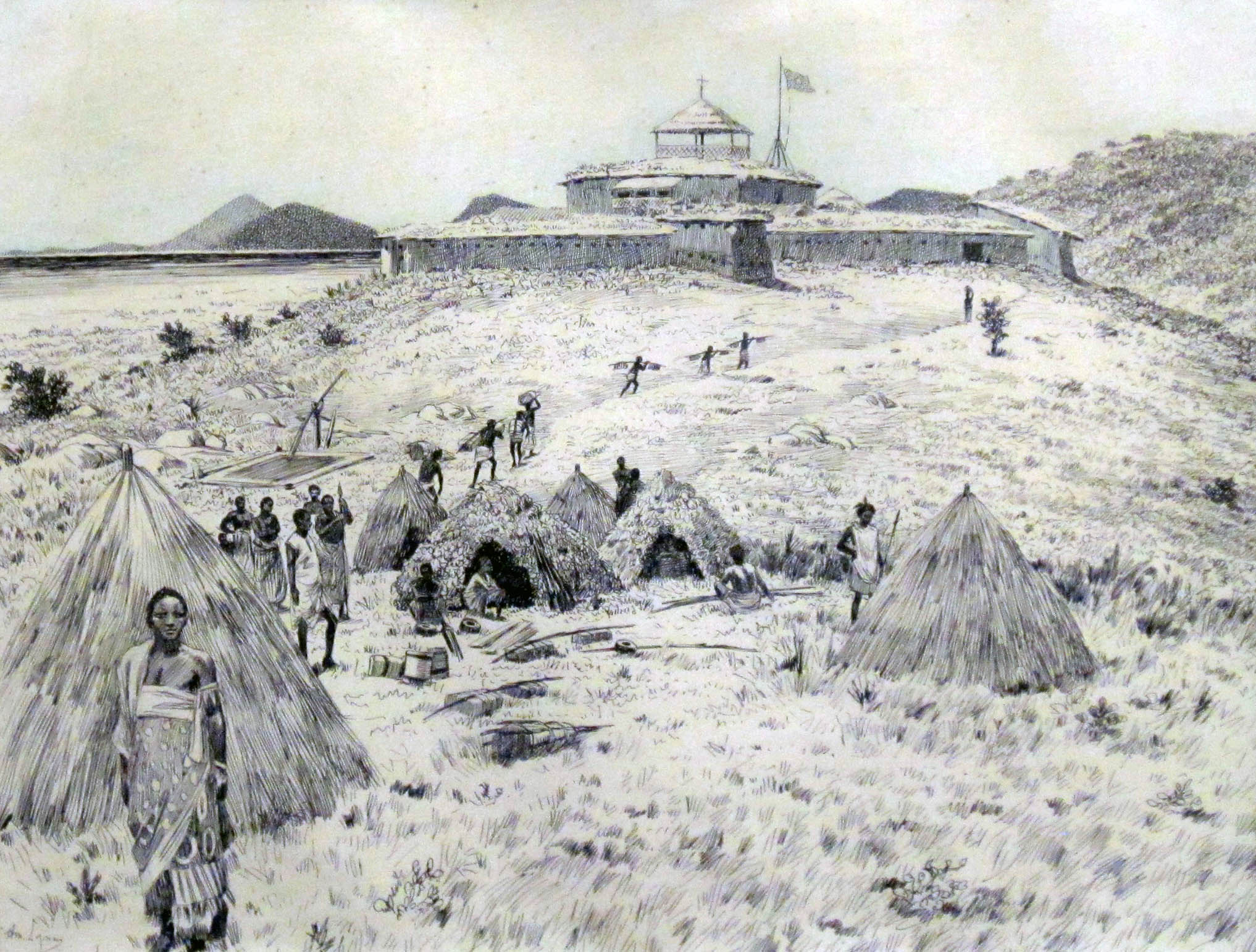
- View of the fort built in Karema by the Congo Free State (1883)
- Nickname: Matimila
- Location within Tanzania
- Coordinates: 6.82052°S 30.43887°E
- Country: Tanzania
- Region: Katavi
- District: Mpanda
- Ward: Karema
- Fort Leopold: 1879
- Founder: Comité D'Études du Haut Congo

Karema (or Kalema) is a settlement in Tanzania, on the east shore of Lake Tanganyika, once the location of a White Fathers mission station.

== Background ==
Lake Tanganyika lies in the east of the Congo Basin. The slave and ivory trader Tippu Tip founded a private empire along the Upper Congo river to the west of the lake in the 1870s, sending his goods to Zanzibar for sale. Karema lay on one of the routes from the Congo to the east coast of Africa.

The International African Association was created in September 1876, with King Leopold II of Belgium as its president, at the International Geographical Conference in Brussels. The Comité D'Études du Haut Congo was created on 25 November 1878 with the aim of opening up the huge Congo Basin to European exploitation. The Comité was a precursor of the Congo Free State, a private enterprise of King Leopold II.

== Belgian military station ==
In 1879 Comité D'Études du Haut Congo occupied Karema, naming it Fort Leopold after King Leopold II of Belgium. In 1882 Captain Émile Storms took command of Karema from Lieutenant Jérôme Becker, whose term of service had expired. Yassagula, chief of the village of Karema, attacked the station soon after Storms arrived. Becker counterattacked with his askaris, put Yassagula's men to flight and destroyed the village. A few months later Yassagula submitted, and from then on was a reliable ally. Becker left the station on 17 November on his homeward journey. Storms strengthened and expanded the post, which was now called Fort Léopold, and started to grow vegetables. He responded to an attack on his couriers with an expedition that defeated the rebel chief on 23 April 1883. However, the German scientist Richard Böhm who accompanied Storms was struck by two bullets in the leg during this action and was laid up for several months. Storms then founded Mpala on the west shore of the lake, opposite Karema, laying the foundations on 4 May 1883.

At the Berlin Conference (1884-1885) the east side of the lake was assigned to the German sphere of influence, including Karema. King Leopold II of Belgium decided to focus his colonizing efforts on the lower Congo. He asked Archbishop Charles Lavigerie, the founder of the White Fathers missionary society, if he would like to replace the Belgian agents by missionaries at the two stations on Lake Tanganyika. Lavigerie accepted.

== Mission ==
The missionaries founded the village of Karema with five hundred redeemed slaves. They needed protection. A former Papal Zouave named Léopold Louis Joubert offered his services to Lavigerie, and this was accepted in a letter of 20 February 1886. Joubert reached Zanzibar on 14 June 1886, and reached the mission at Karema on 22 November 1886. He remained there for some months at the request of the Vicar Apostolic of Tanganyika, Mgr. Jean-Baptiste-Frézal Charbonnier, to protect the mission against attacks by slavers. He then crossed the lake to Mpala in March 1887.

Charbonnier died at Karema on 16 March 1888 and Léonce Bridoux was asked to succeed him. Bridoux died on 20 October 1890. In 1889, Adrien Atiman arrived in Karema and became the mission's medical doctor, which he remained until 1956. The missionaries built a church in 1890 and in 1893 completed a fortified mission house, which is still standing. On 19 June 1891 Adolphe Lechaptois was appointed Bridoux's successor as Vicar Apostolic of Tanganyika and Titular Bishop of Utica. He made his base at Karema, which he reached on 8 September 1891. During the first part of the 20th century Lechaptois opened many schools, as well as five orphanages. The center at Karema became a junior seminary. Lechaptois died on 30 November 1917 at Karema.

On 10 May 1946 the Apostolic Vicariate of Tanzania was renamed the Apostolic Vicariate of Karema, and on 25 March 1953 was promoted to become the Diocese of Karema. On 24 October 1969 it was renamed the Diocese of Sumbawanga, reflecting the transfer of headquarters to the growing city of Sumbawanga.

== Recent years ==
Today Karema is a fishing village. It can be accessed by ferry. As of 2010 the ferry boat was the MV Liemba, formerly the Graf von Götzen, a 1,300 ton steamship that the Germans assembled on the lake in 1913 for use as an armed troop transport. The Catholic mission provides a guesthouse. From Karema there is transport by Land Rover to Mpanda, the district center.
