= Kirungu =

Town in Tanganyika Province, Democratic Republic of the Congo

Kirungu, Baudouinville, Boudewijnstad
- Town
- Interactive map of Kirungu,
- Location within Democratic Republic of the Congo
- Coordinates: 7°4′12″S 29°43′59″E
- Country: DR Congo
- Province: Tanganyika
- Territory: Moba

Kirungu is a town in south-eastern Democratic Republic of the Congo. It is located in the Moba Territory, Tanganyika Province, near the city of Moba.

The town was originally named Baudouinville. It was the site of a White Fathers mission, founded c. 1893.

The town suffered severe flooding in 2025. There is a hospital in Kirungu.
