= Charles Lavigerie =

French Catholic cardinal and missionary (1825–1892)

His Eminence Charles Martial Allemand Lavigerie M. Afr.
- Cardinal Priest of Sant'Agnese fuori le mura
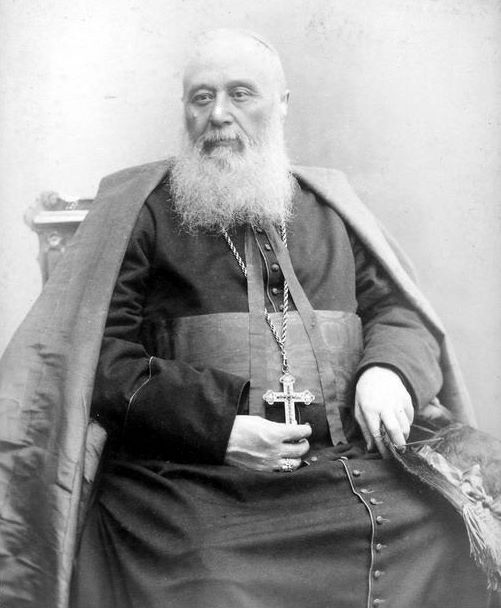
- Lavigerie in 1882
- Installed: 3 July 1882
- Term ended: 26 November 1892
- Predecessor: Pietro Gianelli
- Successor: Georg von Kopp
- Other posts: Archbishop of Carthage (10 November 1884 – 26 November 1892); Archbishop of Algiers (27 March 1867 – 10 November 1884); Bishop of Nancy, France (16 Mar 1863 – 19 January 1867)

Orders
- Ordination: 2 June 1849
- Consecration: 22 March 1863 by Archbishop Marie-Dominique-Auguste Sibour
- Created cardinal: 27 March 1882 by Leo XIII

Personal details
- Born: 31 October 1825 Bayonne, France
- Died: 26 November 1892 (aged 67) Algiers, French Algeria
- Coat of arms

Charles Martial Allemand Lavigerie, M. Afr. (31 October 1825 – 26 November 1892) was a French Catholic prelate and missionary who served as Archbishop of Carthage and Primate of Africa from 1884 to 1892. He previously served as Archbishop of Algiers and Bishop of Nancy. He also founded the Missionaries of Africa (White Fathers). He was created a cardinal in 1882.

After becoming a bishop in France, Lavigerie established French Catholic missions and missionary orders to work across Africa. Lavigerie promoted Catholicism among the peoples of North Africa, as well as the Black natives further south. He was equally ardent to transform them into French subjects.

He crusaded against the slave trade, and he founded the White Fathers, so named for their white cassocks and red fezzes. He also established similar orders of brothers and nuns. He sent his missionaries to the Sahara, Sudan, Tunisia, and Tripolitania. His efforts were supported by the pope and the German Chancellor Otto von Bismarck.

Although anti-clericalism was a major issue in France, the secular leader Léon Gambetta proclaimed, "Anti-clericalism is not an article for export", and he supported Lavigerie's work.

Lavigerie died in 1892 at the age of 67.

== Life ==
Born in Bayonne, he was educated at St Sulpice, Paris. Ordained a priest in 1849, he was a professor of ecclesiastical history at the Sorbonne from 1854 to 1856.

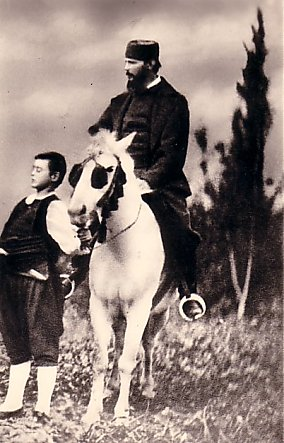
Lavigerie in Syria

In 1856, he accepted the direction of the schools of the East and was thus for the first time brought into contact with the Islamic world. C'est là, he wrote, que j'ai connu enfin ma vocation ("It was there that I learned my calling"). In 1860, as Director of oriental schools, he travelled to Lebanon and Syria to administer relief to Christians there, following the massacre by the Druze. He became known for his missionary work, especially in helping victims of the Druzes. He was made a Chevalier of the Legion of Honor and, in October 1861, shortly after his return to Europe, was appointed French auditor at Rome.

Two years later he was raised to the see of Nancy, where he remained for four years. He declined the appointment of Archbishop of Lyons, requesting instead an appointment to the see of Algiers, recently raised to an archbishopric. Lavigerie landed in Africa on 11 May 1868, when the great famine was already making itself felt, and he began in November to collect the orphans into villages.

This action, however, did not meet with the approval of Marshal MacMahon, governor-general of Algeria, who feared that the natives would resent it as an infraction of the religious peace. He thought that the Muslim faith, being a state institution in Algeria, ought to be protected from proselytism. Lavigerie was given to understand that his sole duty was to minister to the colonists, but the missionary made it clear that he had come to serve the whole population of Algeria.

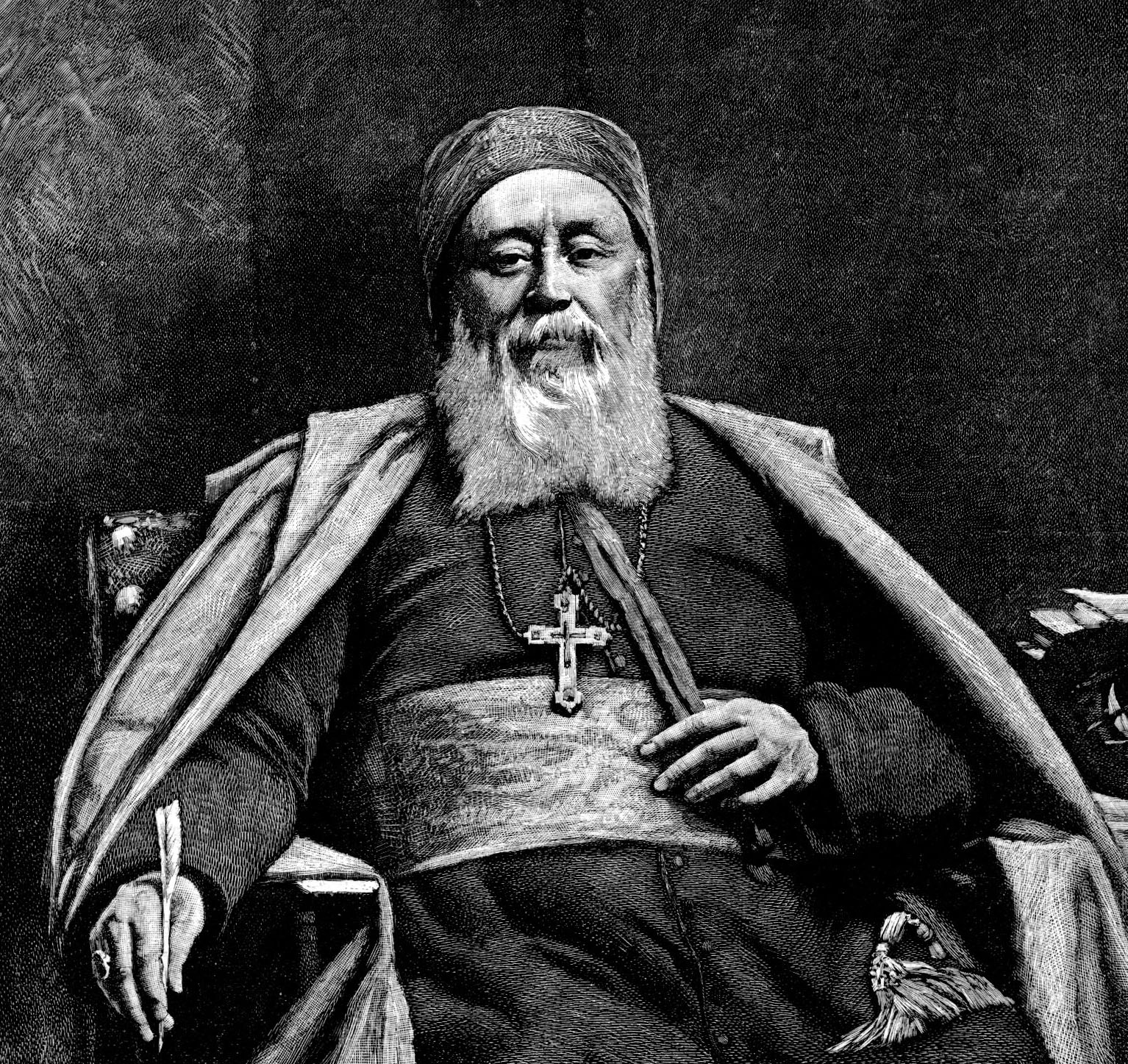
Cardinal Charles Lavigerie, from an 1888 engraving by Ch. Baude from a painting by Bonnat

Contact with the natives during the famine caused Lavigerie to entertain hopes for a general conversion among them. His enthusiasm was such that he offered to resign his archbishopric in order to devote himself entirely to the missions. Pope Pius IX refused, but granted him a coadjutor and placed the whole of equatorial Africa under his charge. In 1870 at Vatican I, Lavigerie warmly supported papal infallibility.

In 1868 he founded the Société des missionnaires d'Afrique, commonly known as the Pères Blancs or White Fathers, after the white maghrebian dress they wore. Lavigerie himself drew up the rule. In 1871, he was twice a candidate for the National Assembly of France but was defeated. He founded the Notre Dame d'Afrique in 1872. In 1874, he founded the Sahara and Sudan mission, and sent missionaries to Tunis, Tripoli, East Africa and the Congo.

From 1881 to 1884, his activity in Tunisia so raised the prestige of France that it drew from Léon Gambetta the celebrated declaration, L'Anticléricalisme n'est pas un article d'exportation ("Anticlericalism is not an article for export") and led to the exemption of Algeria from the application of the decrees concerning the religious orders. On 27 March 1882, the dignity of cardinal was conferred upon Lavigerie, given the titulus of Sant'Agnese fuori le mura, but the great object of his ambition was to restore the see of St Cyprian; and in that also he was successful, for by a bull of 10 November 1884 the metropolitan see of Carthage was re-erected, and Lavigerie received the pallium on 25 January 1885.

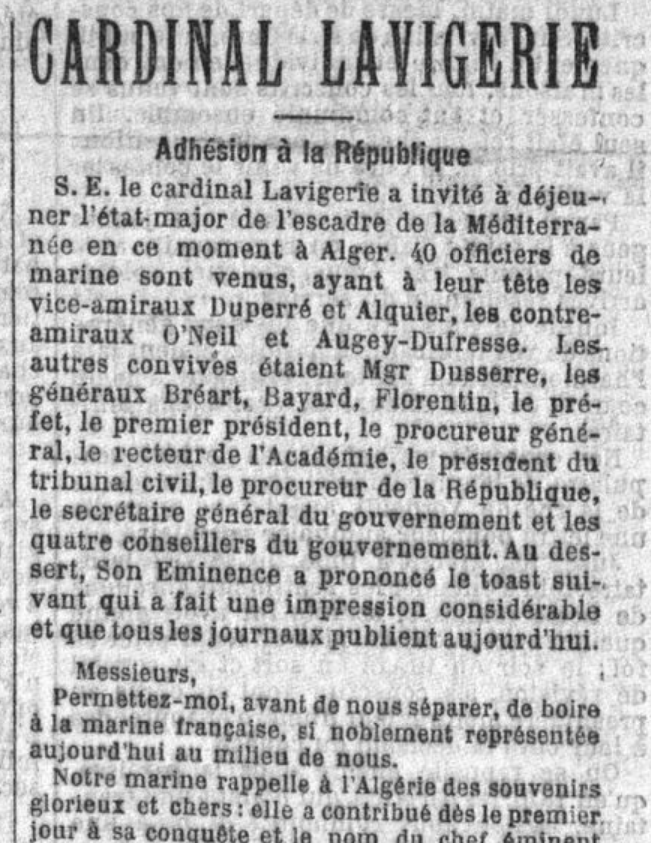
Excerpt from La Croix (November 14, 1890) reporting Cardinal Lavigerie's "Toast of Algiers"

The later years of his life were spent in ardent anti-slavery propaganda and his eloquence moved large audiences in London, as well as in Paris, Brussels and other parts of the continent. He sponsored the education of Adrien Atiman, a medical student who had been ransomed from slavery by the White Fathers, at the University of Malta. He hoped, by organizing a fraternity of armed laymen as pioneers, to restore fertility to the Sahara; but this community did not succeed, and was dissolved before his death.

In 1890, Lavigerie appeared in the new character of a politician and arranged with Pope Leo XIII to make an attempt to reconcile the church with the republic. He invited the officers of the Mediterranean squadron to lunch at Algiers, and, practically renouncing his monarchical sympathies, to which he clung as long as the comte de Chambord was alive, expressed his support of the republic, and emphasized it by having the Marseillaise played by a band of his Pères Blancs. The further steps in this evolution emanated from the pope, and Lavigerie, whose health now began to fail, receded comparatively into the background. He died at Algiers on 26 November 1892.

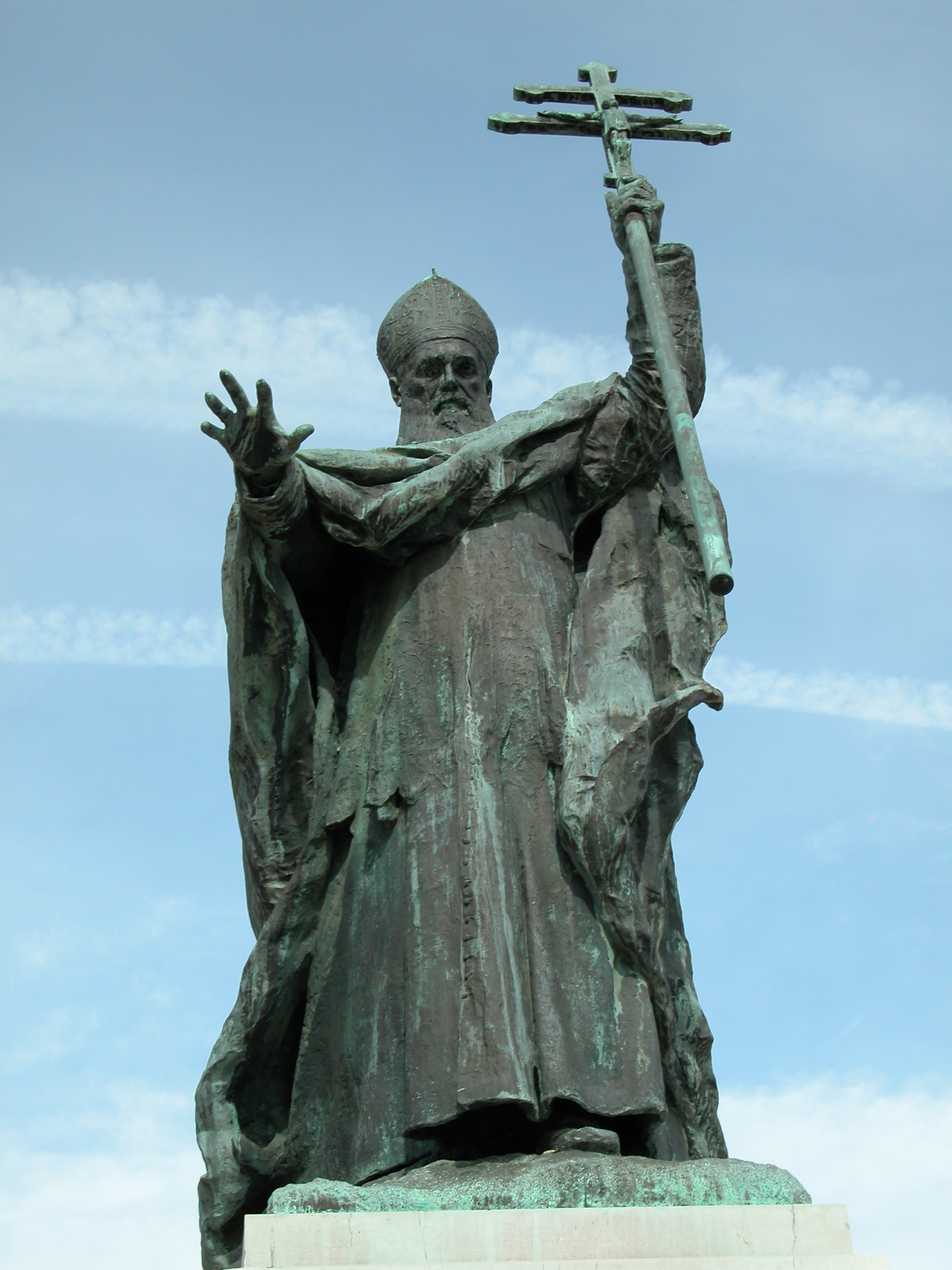
Alexandre Falguière, Monument dedicated to the cardinal Lavigerie in Bayonne (détail).

== Literature ==
There is an abundance of literature published on the life of Charles Lavigerie, much of which has been written by members of the missionary order he founded, the White Fathers, and therefore can be biased. An important work by a French Catholic intellectual and priest is Le cardinal Lavigerie, éd. Ch. Poussielgue, Paris, 1896 by Louis Baunard. The best, and certainly most recent one, containing reference to other literature and source material, is by François Renault, Cardinal Lavigerie. Churchman, Prophet and Missionary (London 1994), translation of: Le cardinal Lavigerie 1852-1892: L’Église, l’Afrique et la France (Paris 1992). Although being a White Father himself, and a former archivist of the missionary order, Renault has been scholarly trained as a historian, having been a professor at the University of Abidjan.

== See also ==
- Catholic youth sports associations of French Algeria
- Listing of the works of Alexandre Falguière
- White Fathers
