= White Fathers =

Roman Catholic society of apostolic life

Missionaries of Africa
- Missionarii Africae
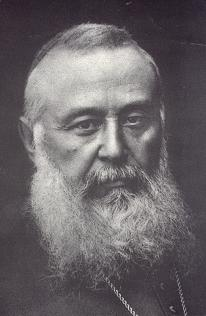
- Charles-Martial Allemand-Lavigerie
- Abbreviation: M.Afr.
- Nickname: White Fathers
- Formation: 1868 (158 years ago)
- Founder: Archbishop Charles-Martial Allemand-Lavigerie
- Founded at: Algiers, French Algeria
- Type: Society of apostolic life of pontifical right (for men)
- Headquarters: Via Aurelia 269, Rome, Italy
- Members: 1,371 members (includes 1,029 priests) as of 2020
- Superior General: Fr. Stanley Lubungo, M. Afr.
- Ministries: Evangelism and education
- Parent organization: Roman Catholic Church
- Website: mafrome.org

The White Fathers (French: Pères Blancs), officially known as the Missionaries of Africa (Latin: Missionarii Africae) and abbreviated MAfr, are a Catholic society of apostolic life of pontifical right for men. They were founded in 1868 by Charles Lavigerie, who was then the Archbishop of Algiers. The society focuses on evangelization and education, primarily in Africa. As of 2021, the Missionaries of Africa comprised 1,428 members from 36 nationalities, working in 42 countries across 217 communities.

== History ==
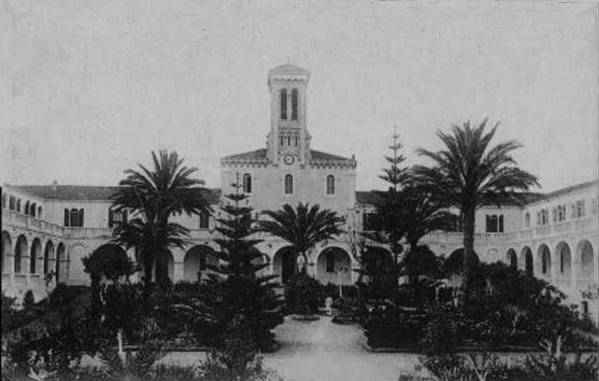
The first convent in Maison-Carrée (now El-Harrach), near Algiers, French Algeria.

The cholera epidemic of 1867 caused the death of 80,000 people in French Algeria and left a large number of Algerian orphans, prompting the establishment of the society of White Fathers in Maison-Carrée (now El-Harrach), near Algiers. While the initial focus of the White Fathers was on the education and Christian instruction of these children, the society's founder, Charles-Martial Allemand-Lavigerie, who was then the Archbishop of Algiers, envisioned the society's mission extending to the conversion of Arabs in the Maghreb and the peoples of Central Africa to Christianity.

Lavigerie instructed his missionaries to integrate with local cultures by speaking the native language, eating the same food, and wearing the same clothing. As a result, they adopted traditional North African attire for their vestments: the gandoura for the cassock, the burnous for the mantle, and the chechia for the zucchetto. They also wore their rosaries with crucifixes as necklaces, symbolizing their religion and imitating the misbaha of the marabouts. This distinctive attire earned them the nickname "White Fathers".

Some missionaries in South Africa had changing attitudes towards indigenous cultures over time, as more interaction led to more nuanced understanding, instead of dismissive views.

A novitiate was established in 1868, and missionary posts were set up in Kabylie and the Sahara. In 1876, three missionaries traveling to Timbuktu were killed by desert nomads. In 1878, ten missionaries departed from Algiers to establish missions at Lakes Victoria, Nyassa, and Tanganyika. That same year, a caravan of missionaries arrived at the port of Mombasa and, after a three-month trek, reached Lake Victoria.

The White Fathers were the largest Christian missionary society operating in Zambia and among the earliest to settle in the country. Their first station, established in 1891 among the Mambwe people in the Tanganyika-Malawi corridor, predated the establishment of British rule. The Mambwe had been harassed by the politically and linguistically dominant Bemba people of northern Zambia, towards whom the White Fathers subsequently directed their efforts.

In 1898, the establishment of the Chilubula mission by Bishop Joseph Dunpont of the Nyasa Vicariate marked the beginning of the White Fathers' mission in Lubemba. This expansion allowed the society to extend its influence further than any other missionary organization in northern Rhodesia. By the mid-1930s, the White Fathers had established approximately twenty missions, primarily in present-day northern and Luapula provinces, with a smaller presence in the eastern Province of Zambia.

Additionally, much of the documentation on the Luganda, spoken in Uganda—such as grammars, dictionaries, and individual articles—is available in English or French. This can be traced back to the French Catholic missionary congregation of the White Fathers and their influence during the colonial period, between 1885 and 1921. The White Fathers, who arrived in the Lake Victoria region in 1879, published six Luganda grammars and dictionaries in French.

Missionaries in the Lake Victoria area actively worked to learn and use local languages, such as Luganda in their work. This was advantageous for them in their goal to integrate themselves into the community and assimilate to the culture.

White Father missionaries in French Algeria ransomed a young slave, Adrien Atiman, and arranged for his education. Atiman later became a medical catechist with the White Fathers at Karema and is known for providing a significant autobiographical account of his enslavement, subsequent freedom, and integration into the White Fathers' mission.

In 1882, at the request of the Holy See, the White Fathers established St. Anne's Seminary in Jerusalem to train Greek Melchite clergy of that rite. The seminary operated until 1967. In 1894, a mission was founded in French Sudan (now Mali).

The Missionaries of Africa experienced more conversions among the LoDagaa in northern Ghana in 1932, during a period of drought and political issues.

Missionaries in northwestern Ghana also got converts through gaining their trust and credibility by healing them. They also used education and through building bonds with local community, and the overall appeal to emotion helped locals have less fear towards conversion to Christianity.

== Present day ==
These now form the present Archdioceses of Kampala, Lilongwe, Gitega, and Tabora, as well as the dioceses of Kigoma, and Kalemie-Kirungu.

The society is composed of missionary priests and brothers. The members take an oath committing them to labor for the conversion of Africa, in accordance with the constitutions of their society. The missionaries are not, strictly speaking, a religious institute, whether an "order" or "congregation". Instead, they are a society of apostolic life. While they may retain their own property, they may only use it within the society at the direction of their superiors.

The White Fathers, members of the international Missionary Society of priests and brothers, numbered:

- 2,098 in 1998
- 1,712 in 2007

As of 2021, the Society is constituted as follows:

-1,144 Missionaries of Africa – fully professed priests, deacons, and brothers:

-467 are living and working in Europe

-120 in the Americas

-510 in Africa

-16 in Asia

-31 in the Generalate in Rome

Although there are currently 460 students at various stages of preparation, many of the White Fathers are retired due to age or ill health. This raises concerns about the future of the Society, which is diminishing in Europe.

=== Formation ===
Currently, the process of becoming a White Father is much longer than it was before. Candidates must first spend one year in a preparatory center. This is followed by 3 or 4 years of philosophy studies. The next step is the Spiritual Year, which takes place in one of three centers in Africa: two are English-speaking, and one is French-speaking. The final period of study, lasting 4 years, takes place either in Africa or Jerusalem.

== Aims ==
One of the key aspects of the rule concerns community life in the missions, with each house required to have at least three members. The head of the society is the General Superior, who is elected every six years by the chapter. He resides in Rome at the Generalate house on Via Aurelia.

Those desiring to become priests or brothers are admitted to the novitiate after completing their philosophical studies. Following the novitiate, they spend two years in missionary training in the field and four years studying theology. The training may vary slightly for brother candidates. The theological studies are conducted at scholasticates currently located in Abidjan (Ivory Coast), Nairobi (Kenya), Merrivale (Devon), South Africa, and Jerusalem. The society admits individuals of all nationalities.

The Missionaries of Africa society claims that, from its origins, it has aimed at the evangelization of the African continent and responding to its growing Islamic footprint. Since its founding by Charles-Martial Allemand-Lavigerie, the White Fathers have been predominantly active in the following areas: the establishment and development of new Christian communities in Africa; the formation of laity and clergy; social work; rural development; and the attempt to convert followers of other faiths — particularly Muslims.

Some early Christian missionaries in Africa were often against traditional funeral rituals, viewing them as pagan, though some scholars later emphasized the importance of these practices in a social manner in African communities.

Missionary activity in colonial Africa often involved not only religious teaching but also public lectures, the formation of institutions, and engagement with communities locally, which would sometimes draw a large audience and influenced society in both social and personal aspects.

The White Fathers live in Regional Houses, with each house required to contain at least three members. The General Superior is at the head of the society and is elected every six years by the chapter. These Regional Houses often have archives that document the progress and goals the White Fathers aimed to achieve. The archives at the Regional House outside Mwanza, Tanzania, provide valuable insight into the research conducted in the areas where the White Fathers lived and worked.

The archives contain the Rapports Annuales and a complete set of Chronique Trimestrielle, which document the White Fathers' progress in pursuing their goals from the 1880s to the late 1950s. The Chronique Trimestrielle was published quarterly and provided information about the mission and their work in the surrounding area and community. The Rapports Annuales included various statistics, such as the number of missionaries, catechists, neophytes, catechumans, baptisms of various categories, marriages, confessions, confirmations, and the number of boys and girls attending school at each mission station. Education was one of the main objectives highlighted in these records and reports.

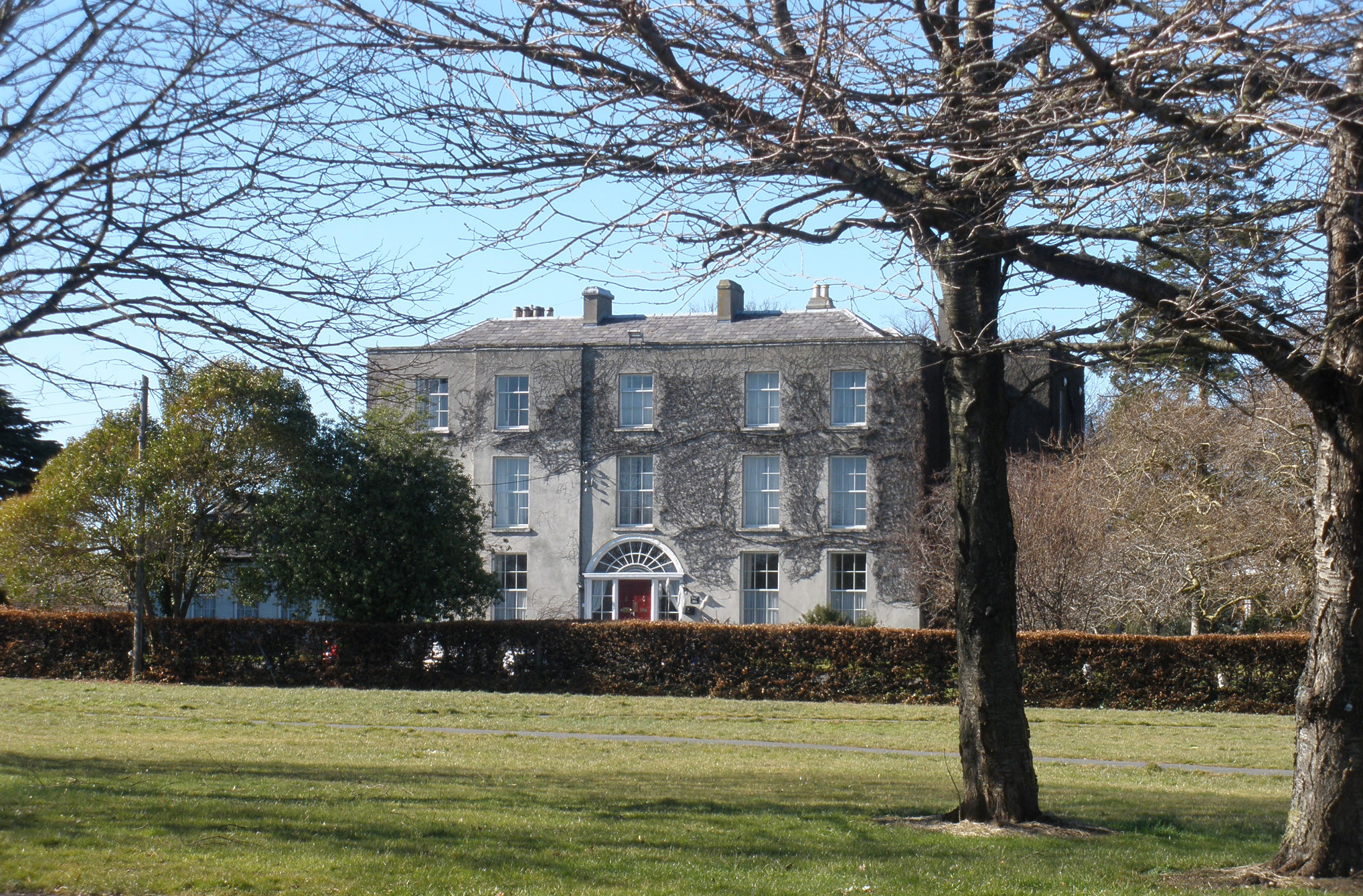
Cypress Grove House, home of the White Fathers in Ireland

=== Leadership ===
From 1874, under the leadership of Archbishop (later Cardinal) Charles-Martial Allemand-Lavigerie, the General Superiors served as the overall leaders of the Society. After the death of Charles-Martial Allemand-Lavigerie in 1892, the position of Superior General evolved into one of ultimate leadership, as the Society's work was no longer overseen by a Cardinal or Archbishop.

Today, the leader of the General Council is the Superior General, Father Stanley Lubungo from Zambia, who is assisted by four councillors: Didier Sawadogo (Burkina Faso), Francis Barnes (British), Martin Grenier (Canadian), and Ignatius Anipu (Ghanaian). Each councillor has specific areas of responsibility, such as overseeing particular countries, which allows them to travel and visit various regions before returning to Rome. All members of the council who hold leadership positions are elected, with the next election scheduled for 2022.

The table below lists all the General Superiors from 1874 to the present day:

Years in Role	General Superiors
1874-1880	Fr. Francisque Deguerry
1880-1885	Fr. Jean-Baptiste-Frézal Charbonnier (later Bishop)
1885-1886	Fr. Léonce Bridoux (later Bishop)
1886-1889	Fr. Francisque Deguerry
1889-1894	Bishop Léon Livinhac (later Archbishop)
1894-11 November 1922	Archbishop Léon Livinhac
1922-1936	Fr. Paul Voillard
22 April 1936 – 30 April 1947	Bishop Joseph-Marie Birraux
5 May 1947 – 1957	Bishop Louis-Marie-Joseph Durrieu
1957-1967	Fr. Léon Volker
1967-1974	Fr. Théoz Van Asten
1974-1980	Fr. Jean-Marie Vasseur
1980-1986	Fr. Robert Marie Gay (later Bishop)
1986-1992	Fr. Etienne Renaud
1992-1998	Fr. Gothard Rosner
1998-2 June 2004	Fr. François Richard
2 June 2004 – 31 May 2010	Fr. Gérard Chabanon
31 May 2010 – 17 February 2016	Fr. Richard Baawobr (became Bishop of Wa, Ghana, earlier in 2016)
27 May 2016 – Present	Fr. Stanley Lubungo

== Zambia ==
The White Fathers were once the largest missionary society in Zambia. In 1891, they established their first station among the Mambwe, an ethnic group from northeastern Zambia, in the Tanganyika-Malawi corridor. This made them the earliest missionaries to settle in the country, even before the effective establishment of British rule following the Berlin Conference in 1885, which placed the Zambian territory under British control.

In 1895, Joseph Dupont took over the Mambwe mission and directed his efforts toward the dominant ethnic group in Northern Zambia, the Bemba.

Joseph Dupont then contacted the Bemba royalty, following the instructions of Lavigerie. The founding Cardinal believed in the "Clovis Model," a strategy for converting indigenous people in Zambia. This model proposed that convincing the king to convert first would lead to the conversion of the population, as the people would follow the king's example and embrace Christianity.

The White Fathers claimed success in converting at least some of the Bemba to Christianity. However, Britain, which sought to exercise indirect colonial control in the region, refused to allow the French White Fathers to establish missions before 1900. By the 1930s, however, the White Fathers were overseeing twenty missions located in the eastern provinces of Zambia. As European institutions remained weak, and mainly depended on local leaders for survival, African political dynamics noticeably changed missionary activity in northern Katanga. They also influenced colonial administration, as they no longer had the same power they once did. This challenged previous ideas and assumptions of dominance of missionaries.

The White Fathers often struggled to get converts and enforce their authority in the northern Katanga region. This happened more particularly in mission areas where they had to compete with Protestant missionaries and local traditions.

Following a request from Zambian authorities for the remains of Joseph Dupont, the bishop's bones were reburied at Chilubula Mission on 15 December 2000. This event was unusual, occurring 88 years after the White Fathers had left Zambia. It highlights the significant influence the White Fathers had at the time and continue to have in Zambia to this day.

Even today, Lusaka is home to the White Fathers' headquarters, where the archival collection remains and was updated in 2001 by Father Hugo Hinfelaar.

== Dress and membership ==
Africa is a continent with high levels of Islamic worship, which influenced the White Fathers' choice of robes resembling those of Algerian Arabs. Algerian Arab robes were often colorful and patterned, known as kaftans, while the White Father missionaries typically wore pure white robes, and in some cases, black. The design was also different, resembling a cassock, the traditional clerical attire in Catholicism. However, due to the African climate, wearing a full cassock was impractical, so robes were designed with inspiration from the gandoura, a popular African garment made from cotton or light material that suited the weather conditions. To complete the attire, they wore a long white cloak known as a burnous. The missionaries also wore a rosary around their necks, symbolizing their devotion to religion and prayer, resembling the misbaha of the Marabouts.

== Archives ==
The official archives of the Missionaries of Africa ("The White Fathers") are located in Rome, Italy. This archival collection is considered private; however, researchers can gain access upon request. The archives are currently managed by the General Secretariat of the Society, with Father Dominique Arnauld serving as the archivist.

While today the official languages of the society are French and English, most records and the limited electronic collection are organized in French. The archives hold a variety of materials, including correspondence, reports, general administration documents, and publications from their founder, Cardinal Lavigerie.

This centralized archive is considered essential for those researching African history, as it contains a wealth of resources. However, many are unaware of the regional "White Fathers" archives that exist within Africa itself.

The archive at the "White Fathers" headquarters in Lusaka, Zambia, was most recently updated in 2001, under the supervision of Father Hugo Hinfelaar. Prior to this, the collections were held at the Ilondola Mission's Language Learning Centre, which had been an open facility for researchers since 1960. The collections were primarily created and cataloged by Father Louis Oger until his death in 1996. These materials included documents detailing the society's administration, history, and personnel. By moving the collections to Lusaka, the archive has become much more accessible, and efforts are underway to actively expand the collections.

A similar regional archive exists in Mwanza, Tanzania, documenting the activities of the "White Fathers" who worked in this area. Although small, it provides valuable insight into the society's missions and contains documents such as the Rapports Annuels. The latter compiles statistics related to the "White Fathers" work, including the number of Sisters and baptisms. Records like these are not available in Rome, highlighting the importance of seeking various archival sources, not just those from the central archive.

Photographic archives related to the "White Fathers" missionary work throughout the 20th century can be found in various institutions, such as the Smithsonian, which provides images of the missions and the Africans living near them in Rwanda and Burundi. Similar photographs are also held in the University of Birmingham archives, documenting a variety of missionary activities across several African countries.

== Publications ==
- Proche-Orient Chrétien, a journal published in Jerusalem

== See also ==
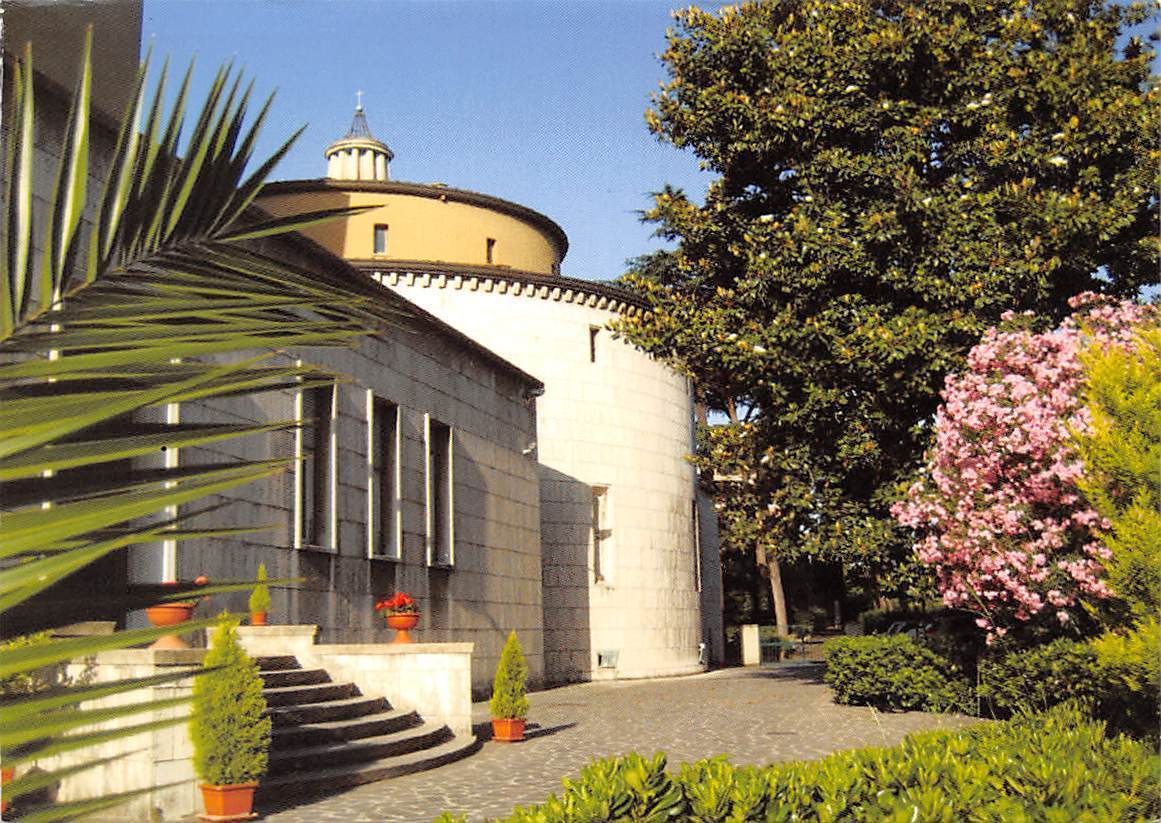
General House in Rome

- Catholic missions
- Bishop Burkhard Huwiler
- Bishop Joseph Dupont
- Melkite Greek Catholic Church
- Mua Mission, Malawi
- Catholic youth sports associations of French Algeria
- The White Fathers Mission in Uganda
