= Marie-Renée =

Marie-Renée is a feminine French given name. Notable people with the name include:

- Marie-Renée Frossard, French ballerina
- Marie-Renée Lavoie (born 1974), Canadian writer
- Marie-Renée Oget (born 1945), French politician
- Marie-Renée Roudaut (1847-1930) was a French missionary nun
- Marie-Renée Ucciani (1883-1963), French painter and sculptor
