= Rotunda of Mosta =

Sanctuary Basilica of the Assumption of Our Lady
- Santwarju Bażilika ta' Santa Marija
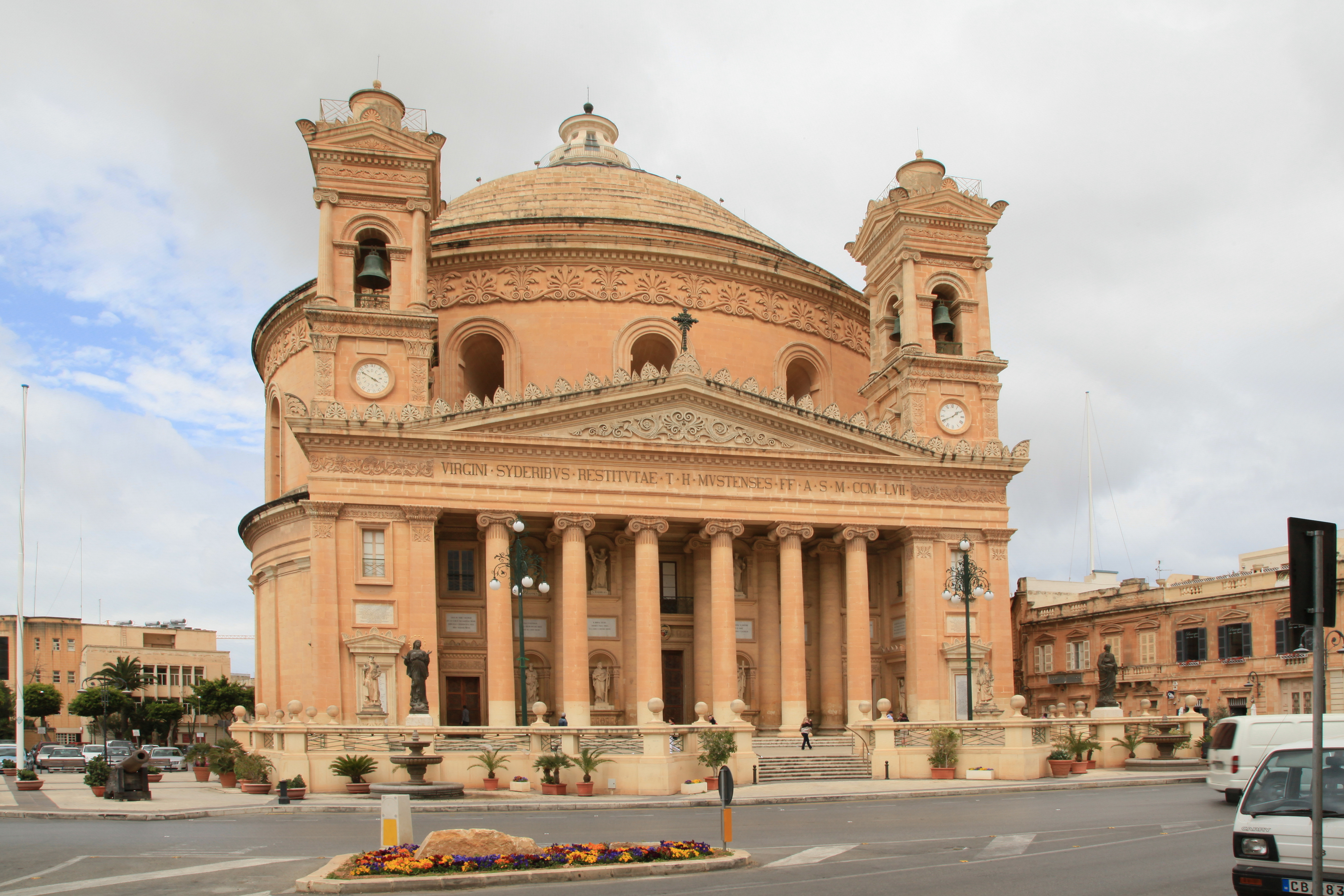
- View of the Rotunda of Mosta
- Sanctuary Basilica of the Assumption of Our Lady
- 35°54′36.3″N 14°25′33.2″E
- Location: Mosta, Malta
- Denomination: Roman Catholic
- Website: mostachurch.com

History
- Status: Minor basilica, Parish church
- Founded: c. 1614
- Dedication: Assumption of Mary
- Dedicated: 15 October 1871

Architecture
- Functional status: Active
- Architect: Giorgio Grognet de Vassé
- Style: Neoclassical
- Groundbreaking: 30 May 1833
- Completed: Early 1860s

Specifications
- Length: 75 m (246 ft)
- Width: 55 m (180 ft)
- Materials: Limestone

Administration
- Archdiocese: Malta

The Sanctuary Basilica of the Assumption of Our Lady (Maltese: Santwarju Bażilika ta' Santa Marija), commonly known as the Rotunda of Mosta (Maltese: Ir-Rotunda tal-Mosta) or the Mosta Dome, is a Roman Catholic parish church and basilica in Mosta, Malta, dedicated to the Assumption of Mary. It was built between 1833 and the 1860s to neoclassical designs of Giorgio Grognet de Vassé, on the site of an earlier Renaissance church which had been built around 1614 to designs of Tommaso Dingli.

The design of the church is based on the Pantheon in Rome, has the third-largest unsupported dome in the world, and is Malta's largest church. The church narrowly avoided destruction during World War II when on 9 April 1942 a German aerial bomb pierced the dome and fell into the church during Mass, but failed to explode.

== History ==
Pietro Dusina recorded Mosta as a parish in his 1575 pastoral visit; the town actually became a parish in 1608. Plans to construct a new church began soon afterwards, and the church was built in around 1614 to designs attributed to the Renaissance architect Tommaso Dingli. This church was commonly called Ta' Ziri.

By the 1830s the town's population had become too large for the church. Giorgio Grognet de Vassé proposed rebuilding the church on a neoclassical design based on the Pantheon in Rome. Opposed by Bishop Francesco Saverio Caruana, the design was approved, and construction of the church began on 30 May 1833.

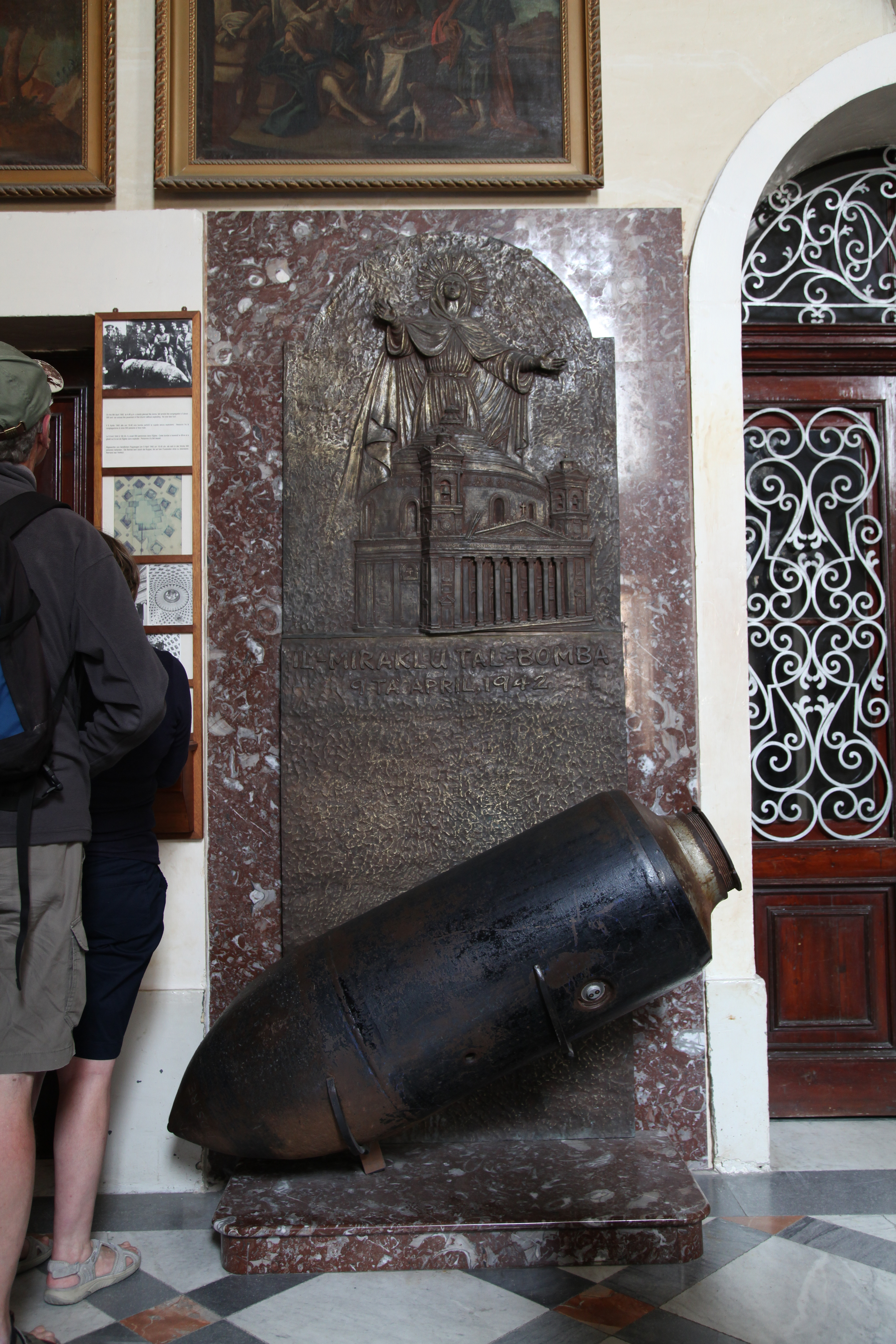
A bomb of the type which pierced the dome on 9 April 1942

The new church was built around the old church, which remained in use throughout the course of construction. The residents of Mosta helped in building the church, taking part in construction work on Sundays and public holidays. Since Grognet had never received any formal architectural training, he received consultation services from an architect of the Sammut family.

The rotunda took 28 years to build, being completed in the early 1860s. The old church was demolished in 1860, and the new church did not need to be consecrated since the site had remained a place of worship throughout the course of construction. The church was officially dedicated on 15 October 1871.

In a bombing by the Nazi air force on 9 April 1942, during the Siege of Malta in World War II, a bomb pierced the dome and entered the church. The bomb did not explode, and a Royal Engineers Bomb Disposal unit defused it and dumped it into the sea off the west coast of Malta. This event was interpreted as a miracle by the inhabitants, and the casing of an identical bomb is now displayed in the sacristy at the back of the church.

On 2 May 1983, taxi driver Carmelo Aquilina deliberately drove a Mercedes car into the Rotunda following a bet. He drove up the steps of the parvis, broke down the main doorway, and stopped within the church close to the altar. Aquilina was arrested and received a three-month prison sentence while his driving licence was suspended.

In 2015 the parish asked the Vatican to be reclassified to the status of a basilica. The church was elevated to a minor basilica on 29 July 2018.

== Architecture ==
The Rotunda of Mosta is built in the neoclassical style, and its structure is based on the Pantheon in Rome. Its façade has a portico with six Ionic columns, which is flanked by two bell towers. Being a rotunda, the church has a circular plan with walls about 9.1 m (30 ft) thick supporting a dome with an internal diameter of 130 ft (40 m). At one time, the dome was the third-largest in the world. The church's interior contains eight niches, including a bay containing the main entrance and a deep apse with the main altar.

Before the church was constructed, there was some opposition to Grognet's design, since some regarded a Roman temple as an unsuitable model for a Catholic church building. Others praised the design, and an 1839 book written while the church was being built described it as "certainly the most magnificent, extensive and solid modern building" in Malta and said "when finished, [the church] will be an ornament to the Island, will immortalize the architect, and draw towards the casal every visitor to Malta." The design was well-received upon completion, and it is regarded as Grognet's masterpiece.

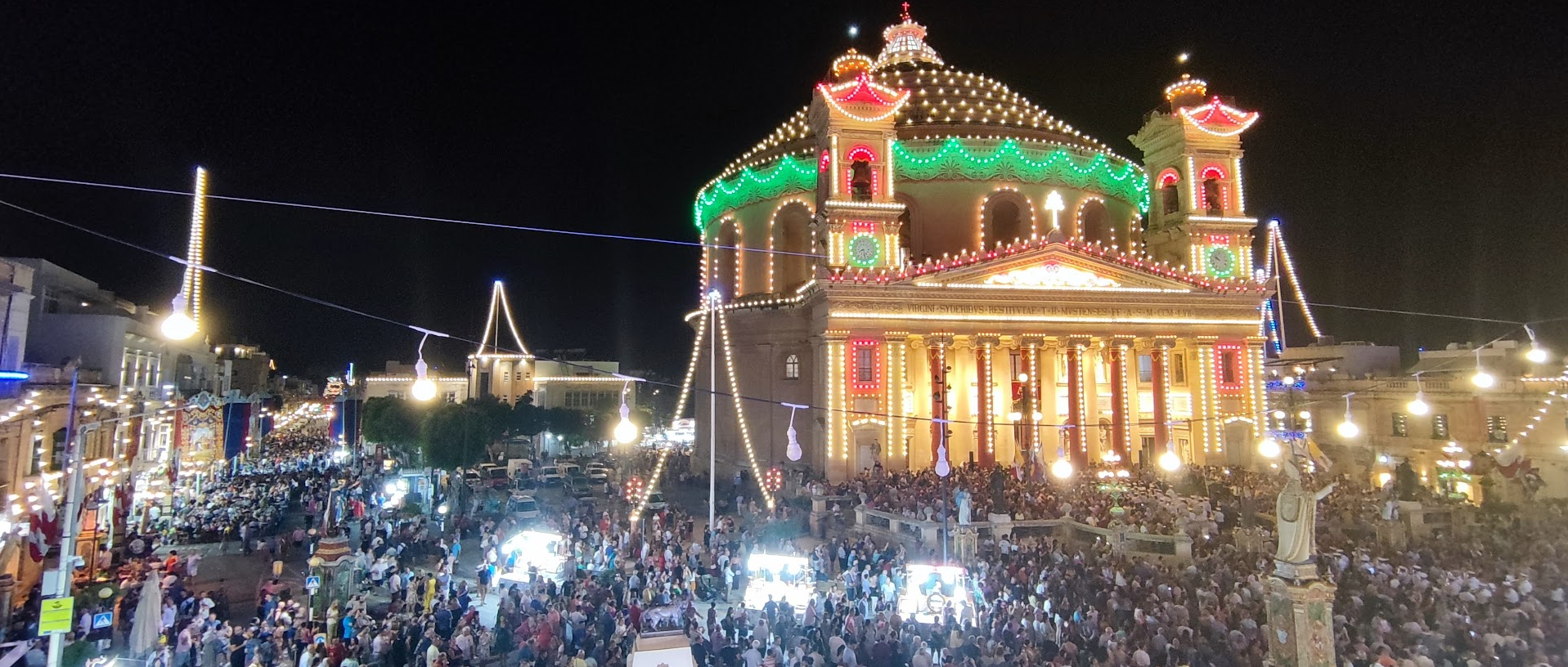
Mosta Rotunda Feast Assumption Of Mary 15th August 2022

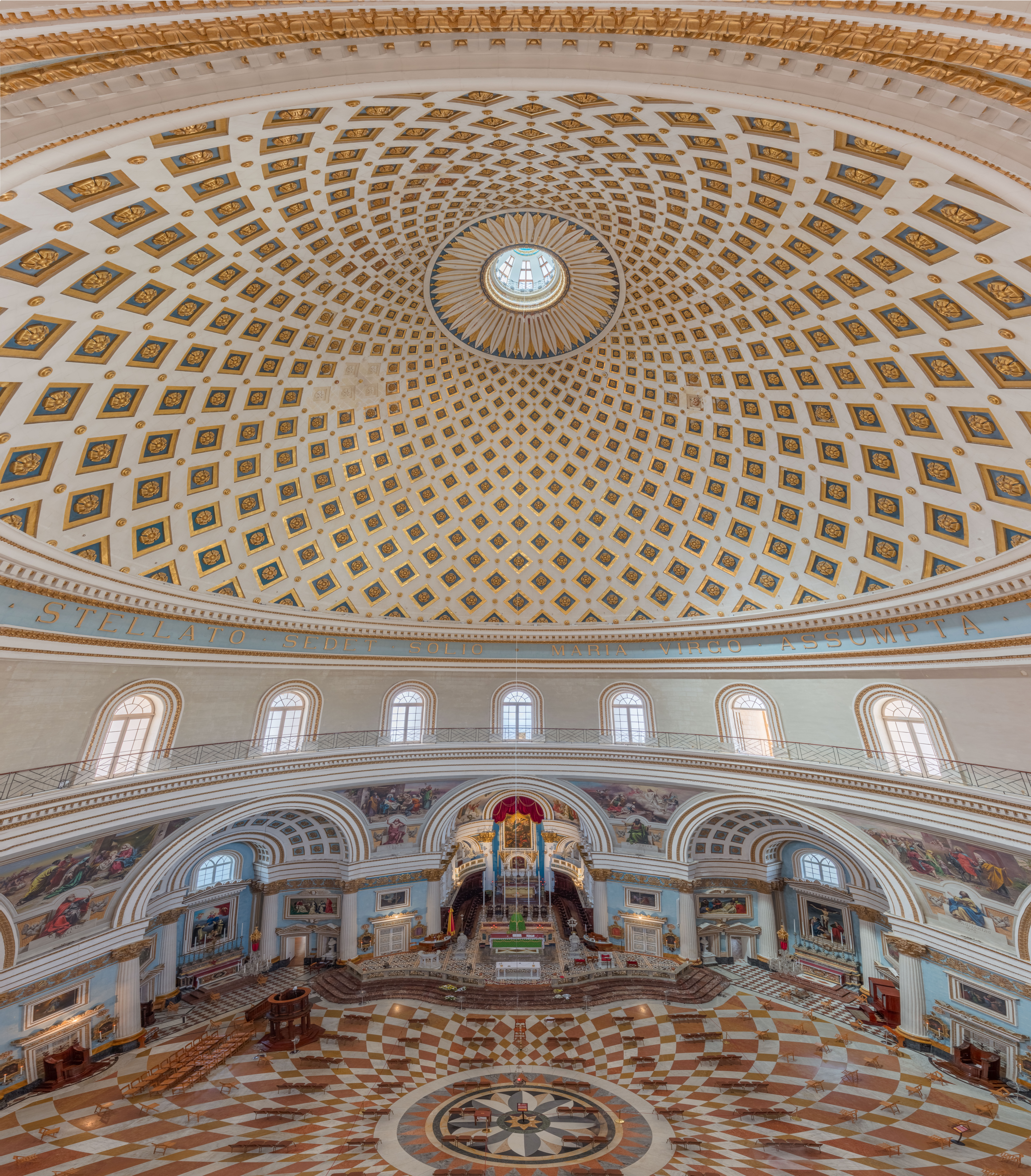
Interior of the rotunda

== See also ==
- List of churches in Malta
- List of largest domes
- Religion in Malta
