= Giorgio Grognet de Vassé =

Maltese architect (1774–1862)

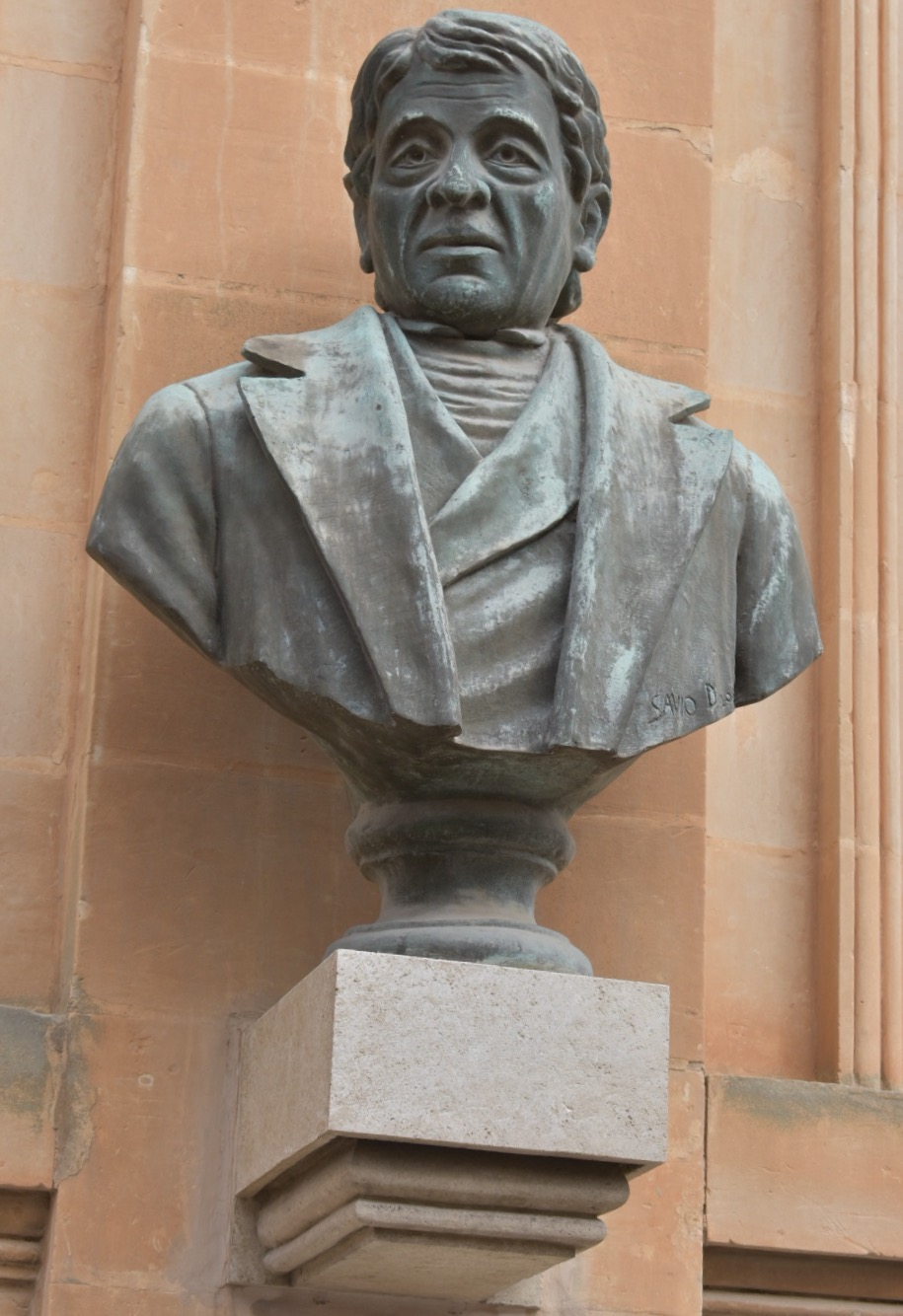
- Bust of Giorgio Grognet de Vassé
- Born: 1774; Hospitaller Malta
- Died: 1862 (aged 87–88); Mosta, Crown Colony of Malta
- Burial place: Chapel of the Virgin, Rotunda of Mosta
- Other names: George Grognet DeVassé
- Occupations: Antiquarian and architect
- Military career
- Allegiance: Jacobins, French First Republic
- Conflicts: Egyptian campaign

Giorgio Grognet de Vassé (1774–1862) was a Maltese architect and antiquarian, who is mostly known for designing the Mosta Basilica, popularly known as the Rotunda of Mosta.

In the late 18th century, he studied at Frascati in the Papal States to become a priest. However, he developed a strong support for the Jacobins, and he joined the French expeditionary force as an officer during the Egyptian campaign. He eventually returned to Malta in the 19th century, some years after the uprising against French rule had ended.

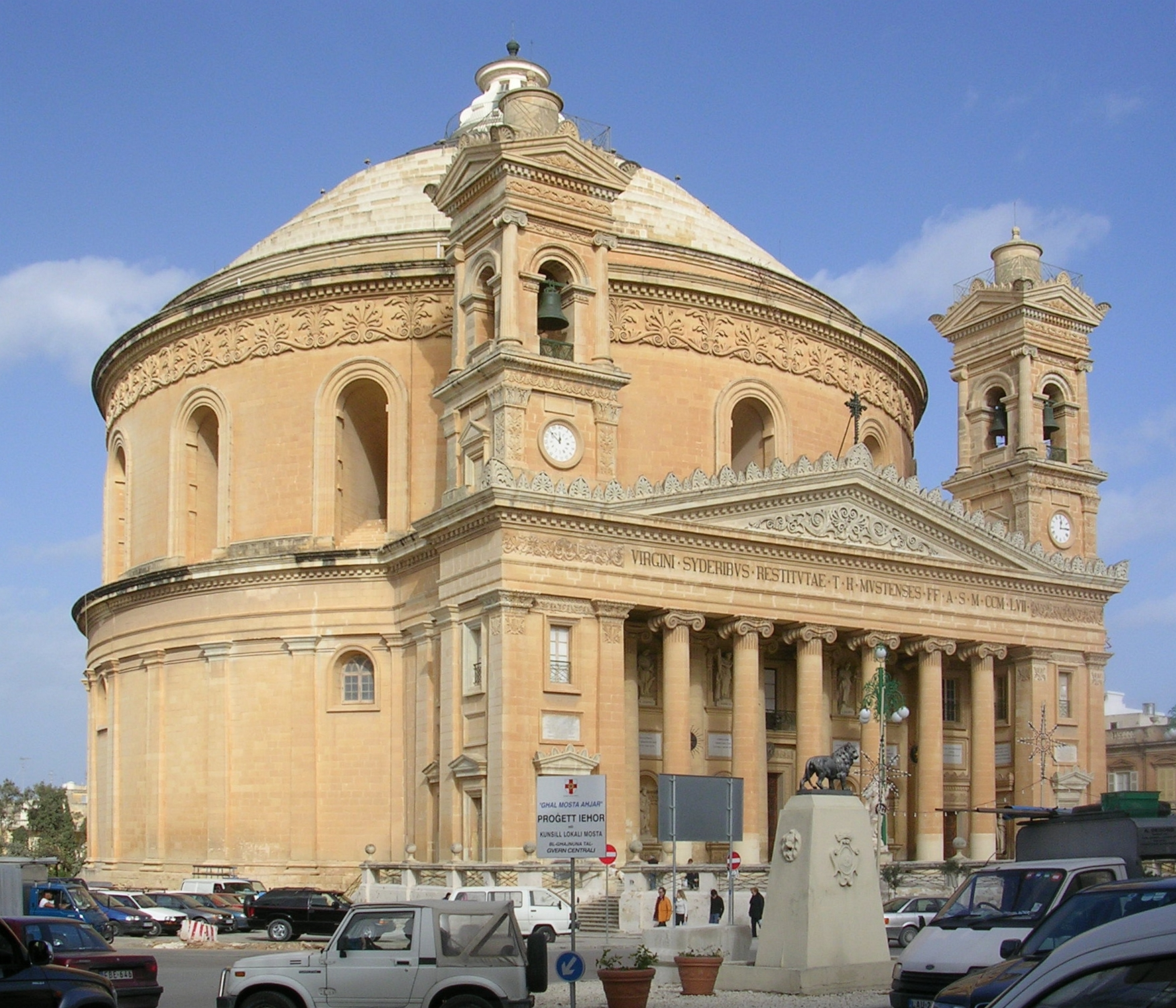
The Rotunda of Mosta, Grognet's masterpiece

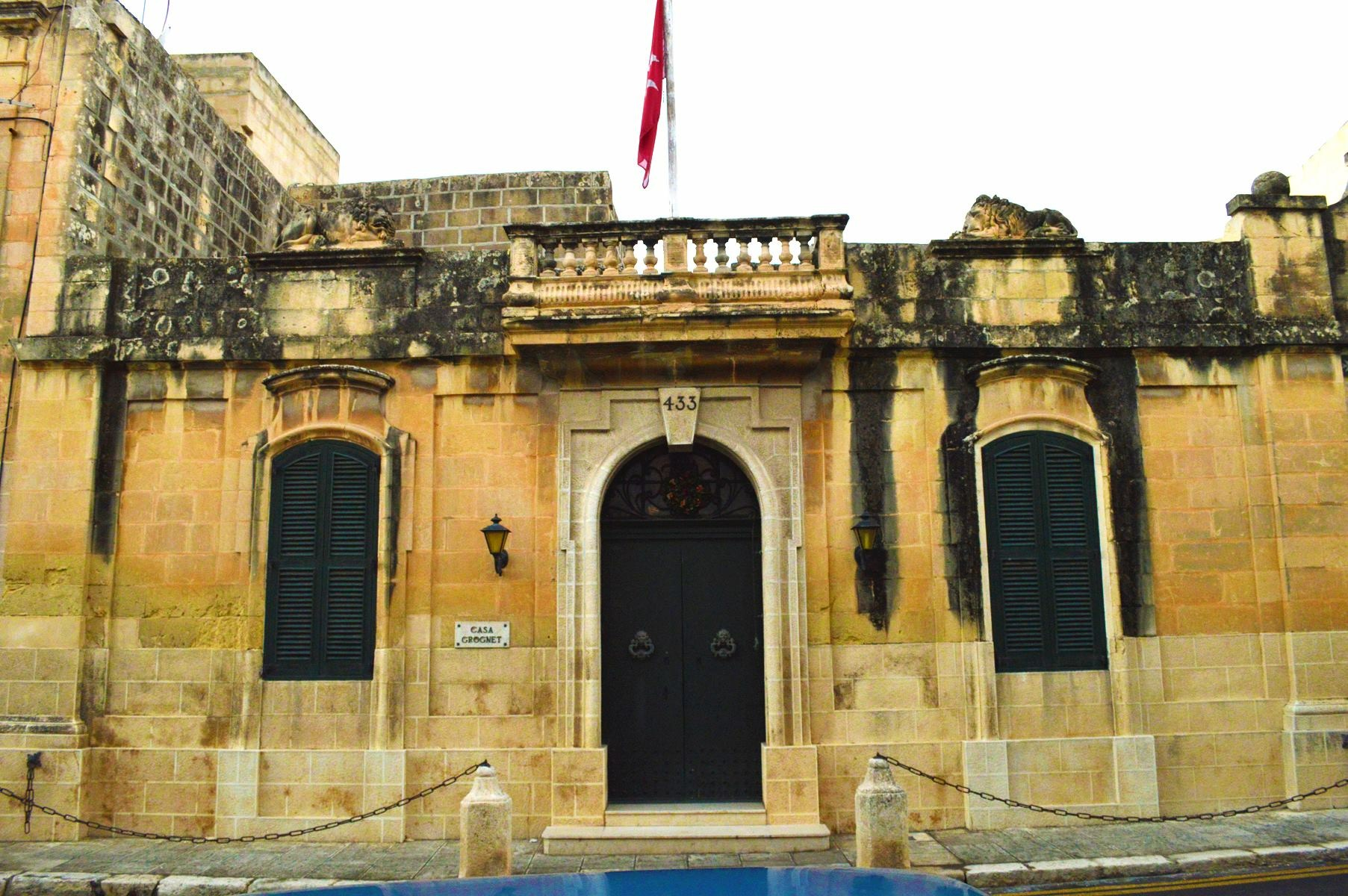
Casa Grognet, Villa Grognet or Palazzo Grognet was the house where Grognet de Vassé lived in Mosta

By the 1830s, the parish church of Mosta, which had been built in the 17th century by the architect Tommaso Dingli, had become too small to cater for the town's population. Grognet proposed rebuilding the church on a neoclassical design based on the Pantheon in Rome. Despite opposition from Bishop Francesco Saverio Caruana, the design was approved and construction of the church began on 30 May 1833. Grognet had never received any formal architectural training, so during construction he received consultation services from a member of the Sammut family. The church took 28 years to build, being completed in the early 1860s. The church's design was praised both during construction and after its completion, and it is considered to be Grognet's masterpiece.

Grognet was also an antiquarian, and he had a deep knowledge of the classics. Following the discovery of ancient sites such as Ġgantija and Ħaġar Qim during his lifetime, he came to believe that Malta was the location of Atlantis. He published a short compendium detailing this theory.

Grognet married Signora Orsetta della Grazie Paleologo in 1834. He lived mostly in the capital Valletta, but while supervising the construction of the rotunda he lived at a house in Mosta belonging to the notary Francesco Chetcuti. This townhouse is now called Villa Grognet, and its design is attributed to Grognet.

Upon completion of the rotunda, Grognet received an annual pension of £100 from Governor Le Marchant, but he died a few months later in 1862. He was buried in the chapel of the Virgin of the Girdle at the Mosta rotunda.
