= Missionary Sisters of Our Lady of Africa =

Missionary society founded in 1869 that operates in Africa

- Sœurs Missionnaires de Notre-Dame d'Afrique
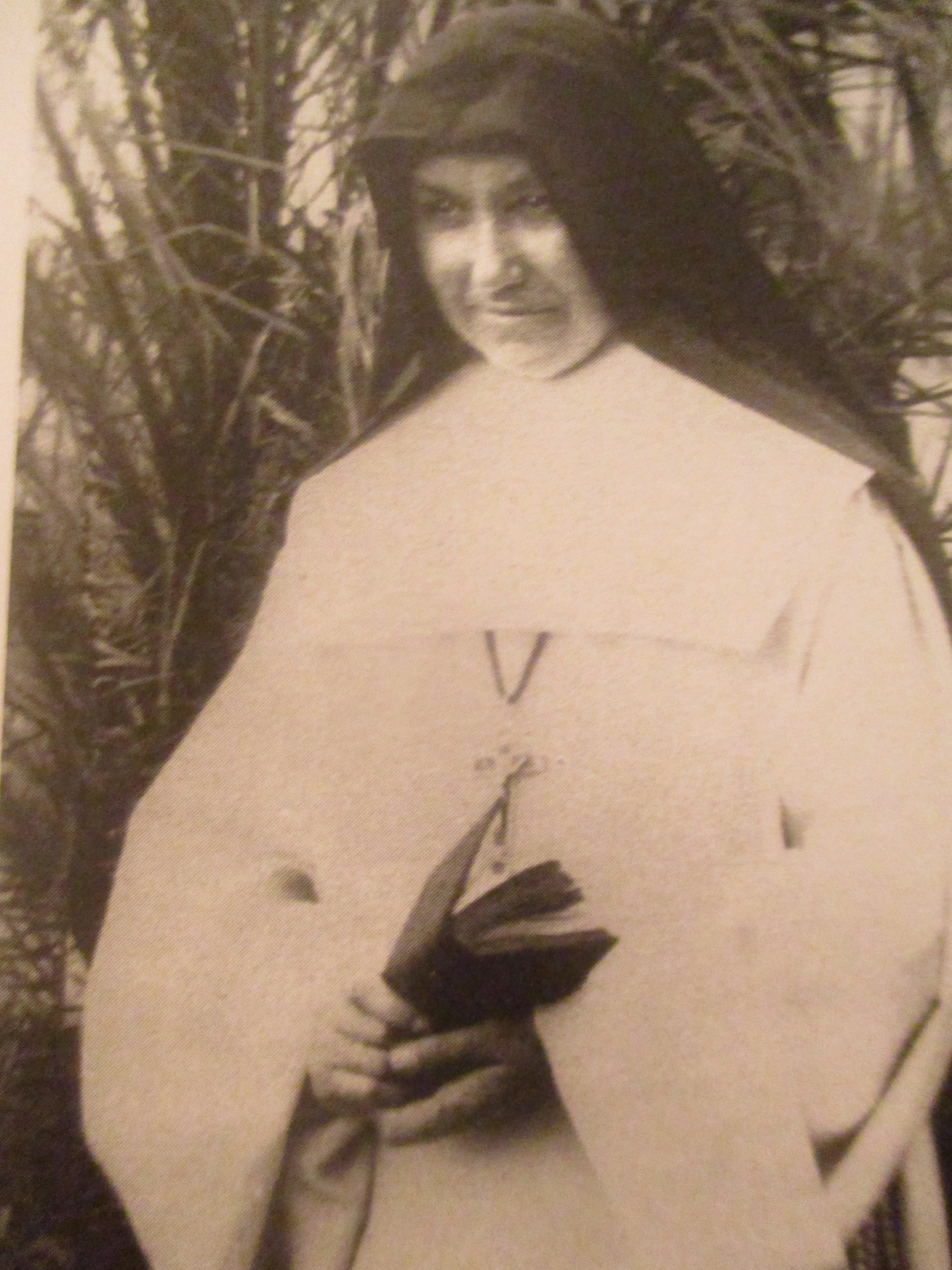
- Mother Marie-Salomé
- Abbreviation: SMNDA
- Formation: 1869; 156 years ago
- Founder: Cardinal Charles Lavigerie
- Type: Missionary Society
- Region served: Africa
- Website: msolafrica.org

The Missionary Sisters of Our Lady of Africa (SMNDA; French: Sœurs Missionnaires de Notre-Dame d'Afrique), often called the White Sisters (Sœurs blanches) (Note: The name "White Sisters" referred to the color of their dress, not their skin. As Africans came to account for increasing numbers of White Sisters, the society tried to revert to the original name of "Missionary Sisters of Our Lady of Africa" or the MSOLA Sisters, but as of 2011 the "White Sisters" label was still persistent.) is a missionary society founded in 1869 that operates in Africa. It is closely associated with the Society of the Missionaries of Africa, or White Fathers.

== Origins ==
In 1868, the archbishop of Algiers, Charles Lavigerie, endorsed the foundation of the Society of Missionaries of Africa, or White Fathers. The main purpose was originally to staff the diocesan orphanages. The next year he founded the Frères agricoles and the Soeurs agricoles et hospitalière, orders of monks and nuns who would work in Christian villages settled by Arab converts from the church orphanages.

Lavigerie sent the Abbé Le Mauff back to his native Brittany to recruit the first sisters, who were to be "generous, brave, ready for anything and capable of becoming the cornerstones of the society." Le Mauff returned on 9 September 1869 with eight young Breton women, of whom four would persevere. At first the sisters were given the task of looking after orphan Arab children. In January 1872, Marie-Renée Roudaut, cousin of one of the first Breton recruits, reached Algeria with four other volunteers. On 23 June 1872, she took the name of Soeur Marie-Salomé, and on 6 July 1873, she pronounced her first vows.

Lavigerie requested help in recruiting nuns from his former diocese of Nancy, and some sisters came from two congregations in Nancy, the Sisters of St. Charles and the Sisters of the Assumption. These two congregations joined to form the Sisters of Our Lady of African Missions in 1878. (Note: The White Sisters should not be confused with the Missionary Sisters of Our Lady of Apostles, founded in 1876 to work with the fathers of the Society of African Missions that Mgr. Melchior de Marion Brésillac had established in 1856.) In 1880, Mother Marie-Salomé was placed in charge of the novitiate, and in 1882 she was elected Superior General of the White Sisters at the first General Chapter of the Congregation. She would head the group until 1925. Lavigerie was uncertain about the viability of the congregation, and at times considered dissolving it. It was not until 1893 that Rome finally recognized the Institute as a mission.

== Organization ==
=== Objectives ===
Lavigerie's goal was to evangelize the entire continent of Africa. He felt that only women could work with women. (Note: Although the sisters could work with women more easily than the White Fathers, their vow of chastity meant they were debarred from some aspects of women's life, such as sexual initiation rites.) Lavigerie said the main goal of the missionaries was to train Africans, who would in turn bring Christianity to the people of Africa. The missionaries should learn the local language, respect local customs, avoid political or racial disputes, and devote their entire life to the mission. Lavigerie warned missionaries not to do anything to generate hostility from Muslims, but to work on raising awareness of the values taught by the Gospel. The special relationship with Islam is due in part to the Algerian origin of the society. Unlike other female Catholic orders, the White Sisters did not specialize in teaching or nursing, but evangelized through home visits and religious instruction.

=== Recruitment ===
At first the White Sisters were mainly French, but later missionaries joined from other countries. The first community of White Sisters in Canada was established in Quebec City in October 1903, with three French and one Canadian sister. Their goal was to recruit young women as missionaries. Over the next century, 464 women from Canada and 93 from the United States joined the White Sisters. Membership peaked in 1966, with 2,163 sisters worldwide. By 2003, that had fallen to 1,050, led by a Scottish Superior General, Marie McDonald. In 2008, there were about 900 sisters, about half of whom were in Europe and a quarter in Africa. As of 2013, outside Africa there were communities in ten European countries, Canada, the United States, Mexico and one country in Asia.

=== Rules ===
A novice must be no more than 35 years old, and preferably has completed high school at least two years before becoming a candidate. A nine-month postulancy is followed by an eleven-month novitiate. The novice is taught about the rules of the community, the African people and culture, and ascetical theology. The sisters' morning and evening prayers are Prime and Compline from the Divine Office. At different intervals each day the sisters say the fifteen decades of the rosary. They also practice meditation, spiritual reading and visits to the Blessed Sacrament.

== Sample work in Africa ==
=== Uganda ===
The first White Sisters reached the new formed British protectorate of Uganda in 1899. Some of the White Sisters had first spent time with the Missionary Sisters of Our Lady of Apostles in Ardfoyle, Cork, Ireland, to learn English. In 1902, the White Sisters began work in Buddu, Uganda, led by Mother Mechtilde. By 1907, the mission had 140 resident girls, some wanting to become nuns. A novitiate was established in 1908 and the first three nuns were professed in 1910. Bannabikira (Daughters of the Virgin) was founded that year, one of the oldest of African Catholic sisterhoods. At first the nuns were not required to make a vow of poverty or to make a lifetime commitment. By 1926, the community, with headquarters in Buddu, was led by the first Ugandan mother superior, Mama Cecilia Nalube (Mother Ursula.) The community now required a change of name, vow of poverty and lifetime commitment.

=== Zambia ===
The White Sisters arrived in Northern Rhodesia, today's Zambia, in 1902. Women played an important social role in Bembaland in the northeast of today's Zambia, and could be very effective in proselytizing. The White Fathers were glad to have the White Sisters take the lead in the apostolate of women in regions where they were present. In the 1920s, they set up their first school in the region at Chilubula, using the premises vacated when the seminary moved to Lubushi, but at first had difficulty keeping girls in school when they reached the early age of marriage. They established the "Children of Mary" at Kayambi to give young women religious instruction and to try to ensure that the girls avoided cohabiting with their fiancés before marriage. In Chilubi the African sisters became independent of the White Sisters in 1947. In 1967, the Sisters of the Child Jesus took over the schools that the White Sisters had founded in Zambia.

=== Tanzania ===
After taking it from the Germans during World War I, the Belgians occupied Ujiji in what is now Tanzania from 1916 to 1920, and called on the White Sisters for medical help. As well as treating Belgian soldiers, the White Sisters provided medical services to the African communities, in the hope of converting them from Islam or traditional religions. They remained after the British took over, and by 1920 were seeing about forty five patients a day at their clinic in Ujiji. They treated venereal diseases, yaws, malaria and other disease. They had to deal with a smallpox epidemic that broke out in September 1922. Immediately after World War I, the British ordered the European women missionaries to leave their mission in Kilema, Tanganyika for South Africa. For five years the mission was successfully run by African sisters until the missionaries were allowed to return.

=== Other countries ===
In 1949, the White Sisters founded Action Sociale in Burundi, a program for women. In 1956. the White Sisters founded the Rencontres Africaines organization in Bamako, Mali. The goals were mainly educational. Their magazine Rencontres Africaines was first published in January 1958, and continued to appear until 1964. By 2003, there were communities in Algeria, Tunisia, Mauretania, Mali, Burkina, Ghana, Chad, Congo, Rwanda, Burundi, Kenya, Uganda, Malawi, Zambia, Tanzania and Mozambique.

== See also ==
- Carmen Sammut
