= Côtes-d'Armor's 4th constituency =

Constituency of the National Assembly of France

4th constituency of the Côtes-d'Armor
- inline Constituency of the National Assembly of France

- Constituency in department

- Côtes-d'Armor in France
- Deputy: Murielle Lepvraud; LFI
- Department: Côtes-d'Armor
- Cantons: Bégard, Belle-Isle-en-Terre, Bourbriac, Callac, Gouarec, Guingamp, Lanvollon, Maël-Carhaix, Plestin-les-Grèves, Plouagat, Plouaret, Rostrenen, Saint-Nicolas-du-Pélem

The 4th constituency of the Côtes-d'Armor is a French legislative constituency in the Côtes-d'Armor department (French: département). Like the other 576 French constituencies, it elects one MP using the two-round system, with a run-off if no candidate receives over 50% of the vote in the first round.

== Deputies ==
Election	Member	Party
1958	Alain Le Guen	MRP
1962	Alain Le Guen	MRP
1967	Édouard Ollivro	CD
1968	Édouard Ollivro	CD
1973	Édouard Ollivro	CD
1978	François Leizour	PCF
1981	Maurice Briand	PS
1986	Proportional representation - no election by constituency	
1988	Maurice Briand	PS
1993	Daniel Pennec	RPR
1997	Félix Leyzour	PCF
2002	Marie-Renée Oget	PS
2007	Marie-Renée Oget	PS
2012	Annie Le Houérou	DVG
2017	Yannick Kerlogot	LREM
2022	Murielle Lepvraud	LFI
2024	Murielle Lepvraud	LFI

== Election results ==
=== 2024 ===
Candidate	Party	Alliance	First round			Second round		
Candidate	Party	Alliance	Votes	%	+/–	Votes	%	+/–
Noël Lude	RN		19,700	34.30	+18.17	23,333	45.25	new
Murielle Lepvraud	LFI	NFP	17,826	31.03	+3.82	28,234	54.75	+1.36
Cyril Jobic	REN	Ensemble	17,555	30.56	+4.63	withdrew		
Sylvie Lironcourt	LO		1,505	2.62	+1.43			
Danielle Le Men	REC		854	1.49	-1.24			
Votes			57,440	100.00		51,567	100.00	
Valid votes			57,440	96.31	-1.10	51,567	87.27	-4.54
Blank votes			1,441	2.42	+0.71	5,136	8.69	+3.51
Null votes			757	1.27	+0.40	2,385	4.04	+1.02
Turnout			59,638	73.12	+17.97	59,088	72.45	+17.85
Abstentions			21,928	26.88	-17.97	22,473	27.55	-17.85
Registered voters			81,566			81,561		
Result			LFI HOLD					

=== 2022 ===
Legislative Election 2022: Côtes-d'Armor's 4th constituency
Party	Candidate	Votes	%	±%
LFI (NUPÉS)	Murielle Lepvraud	11,852	27.21	-15.97
LREM (Ensemble)	Yannick Kerlogot	11,296	25.93	-8.57
RN	Noël Lude	7,027	16.13	+6.67
PS	Alain Gueguen*	5,552	12.75	N/A
LR (UDC)	Jean-Paul Prigent	2,964	6.80	−0.48
DVG	Arnaud Toudic	1,391	3.19	N/A
REC	Edwige Vinceleux	1,189	2.73	N/A
Others	N/A	2,291	5.26	
Turnout		43,562	55.15	−2.98
2nd round result
LFI (NUPÉS)	Murielle Lepvraud	21,716	53.42	+3.91
LREM (Ensemble)	Yannick Kerlogot	18,939	46.59	−3.91
Turnout		40,655	54.59	
LFI gain from LREM				

* PS dissident

=== 2017 ===
Candidate	Label	First round		Second round	
Candidate	Label	Votes	%	Votes	%
Yannick Kerlogot	REM	15,412	34.50	18,053	50.49
Annie Le Houérou	PS	8,093	18.12	17,705	49.51
Murielle Lepvraud	FI	4,925	11.03		
Cinderella Bernard	PCF	4,639	10.38		
Sandrine Madec	FN	4,224	9.46		
Martine Tison	LR	3,251	7.28		
Sylvie Bourbigot	ECO	1,630	3.65		
Jean-Pierre Le Neun	REG	963	2.16		
Thierry Perennes	EXG	510	1.14		
Jean-François Le Bihan	REG	387	0.87		
Sylvie Lironcourt	EXG	339	0.76		
Nicolas Noël	DIV	298	0.67		
Votes		44,671	100.00	35,758	100.00
Valid votes		44,671	97.63	35,758	89.69
Blank votes		698	1.53	2,581	6.47
Null votes		386	0.84	1,529	3.84
Turnout		45,755	58.13	39,868	50.66
Abstentions		32,952	41.87	38,822	49.34
Registered voters		78,707		78,690	
Source: Ministry of the Interior

=== 2012 ===
2012 legislative election in Cotes-D'Armor's 4th constituency
Candidate	Party	First round		Second round	
Candidate	Party	Votes	%	Votes	%
Annie Le Houerou	PS dissident	16,312	32.02%	32,487	68.52%
Valérie Garcia	UMP	9,313	18.28%	14,926	31.48%
Gérard Lahellec	FG	8,457	16.60%		
Michel Balbot	EELV–PS	6,327	12.42%		
Pierre Salliou	MoDem	4,791	9.41%		
Catherine Blein	FN	3,676	7.22%		
Maïwenn Salomon	Breizhistance	711	1.40%		
Marine Voisin	??	491	0.96%		
Marie-Pierre Menguy	LO	359	0.70%		
Thierry Richard		254	0.50%		
Isabelle Montillet	MPF	248	0.49%		
Valid votes		50,939	98.35%	47,413	94.87%
Spoilt and null votes		852	1.65%	2,565	5.13%
Votes cast / turnout		51,791	65.05%	49,978	62.76%
Abstentions		27,831	34.95%	29,654	37.24%
Registered voters		79,622	100.00%	79,632	100.00%

=== 2007 ===
Legislative Election 2007: Côtes-d'Armor's 4th constituency
Party	Candidate	Votes	%	±%
PS	Marie-Renée Oget	17,014	32.61	
UMP	Marie-Elisabeth Bague	13,651	26.16	
PCF	Gérard Lahellec	6,513	12.48	
MoDem	Marie-Françoise Droniou	5,333	10.22	
REG	Mona Bras	2,570	4.93	
LCR	Sylvie Guillou	1,830	3.51	
FN	Myriam de Coatparquet	1,392	2.67	
PRG	Michel Priziac	1,175	2.25	
MPF	Margaret Studler	1,097	2.10	
Others	N/A	1,603	-	
Turnout		53,200	66.59	
2nd round result
PS	Marie-Renée Oget	33,068	63.22	
UMP	Marie-Elisabeth Bague	19,241	36.78	
Turnout		53,971	67.56	
PS hold				

=== 2002 ===
Legislative Election 2002: Côtes-d'Armor's 4th constituency
Party	Candidate	Votes	%	±%
PS	Marie-Renée Oget	14,360	26.21	
UMP	Jean-Pierre Le Goux	11,352	20.72	
DVD	Daniel Pennec	10,446	19.07	
PCF	Gérard Lahellec	8,670	15.83	
FN	Myriam de Coatparquet	2,816	5.14	
LV	Michel Balbot	2,272	4.15	
LCR	Guy Jourdon	1,594	2.91	
REG	Mona Bras-Caillarec	1,223	2.23	
Others	N/A	2,045	-	
Turnout		55,965	70.73	
2nd round result
PS	Marie-Renée Oget	30,253	55.82	
UMP	Jean-Pierre Le Goux	23,941	44.18	
Turnout		54,194	70.90	
PS gain from PCF				

=== 1997 ===
Legislative Election 1997: Côtes-d'Armor's 4th constituency
Party	Candidate	Votes	%	±%
RPR	Daniel Pennac	18,215	31.86	
PCF	Félix Leyzour	17,009	29.75	
PS	Jean Le Floc'h*	13,189	23.07	
FN	Myriam de Coatparquet	2,988	5.23	
LV	Bernard Prigent	1,874	3.28	
GE	Alice Boisson	1,331	2.33	
REG	Patrick L'Hereec	1,261	2.21	
LDI	Louis Marteil	671	1.17	
LCR	Dominique Daniel	636	1.11	
Turnout		59,176	76.25	
2nd round result
PCF	Félix Leyzour	34,404	56.88	
RPR	Daniel Pennac	26,086	43.12	
Turnout		62,993	81.18	
PCF gain from RPR				

* Withdrew before the 2nd round.

== Sources ==
- Official results of French elections from 1998: "Résultats électoraux officiels en France" (in French). Archived from the original on 20 December 2011.
