= Yannick Kerlogot =

French politician

Member of the National Assembly for Côtes-d'Armor's 4th constituency
- In office 21 June 2017 – 21 June 2022
- Preceded by: Annie Le Houérou
- Succeeded by: Murielle Lepvraud

Personal details
- Born: 12 May 1970 (age 56) Saint-Brieuc, France
- Party: La République En Marche!
- Education: Rennes 2 University

Yannick Kerlogot (born 12 May 1970) is a French politician of La République En Marche! (LREM) who served as a member of the French National Assembly from the 2017 elections till 2022, representing the department of Côtes-d'Armor.

== Political career ==
In parliament, Kerlogot serves on the Committee on Cultural Affairs and Education.

== Political positions ==
In July 2019, Kerlogot decided not to align with his parliamentary group's majority and became one of 52 LREM members who abstained from a vote on the French ratification of the European Union’s Comprehensive Economic and Trade Agreement (CETA) with Canada.

== See also ==
- 2017 French legislative election
