= Murielle Lepvraud =

French politician

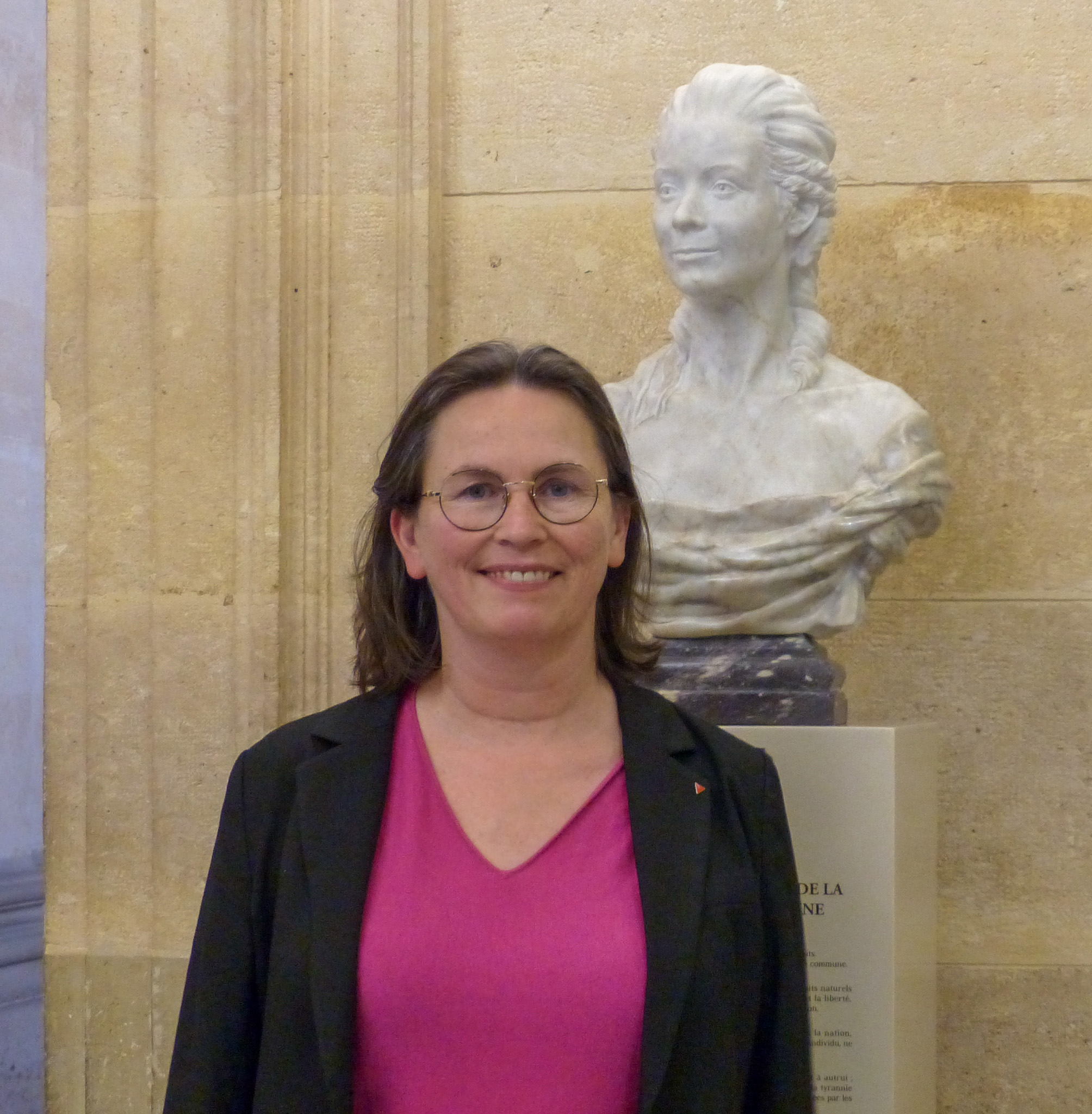

Member of the French National Assembly
- Incumbent
- Assumed office 22 June 2022
- Preceded by: Yannick Kerlogot
- Constituency: Côtes-d'Armor's 4th constituency

Personal details
- Born: July 15, 1974 (age 52) Loudéac, France
- Party: La France Insoumise
- Occupation: Secretary

Murielle Lepvraud is a French politician. A member of La France Insoumise, she currently serves as National Assembly deputy for Côtes-d'Armor's 4th constituency.

== Biography ==
Lepvraud was born on 15 July 1974 in Loudéac, in the Côtes-d'Armor department, in Brittany.

She began her involvement in politics following the 2005 French European Constitution referendum.

In 2016, she joined the newly founded left-wing party La France Insoumise, led by Jean-Luc Mélenchon. In the 2017 French legislative election, she ran in Côtes-d'Armor's 4th constituency with LFI, finishing in third place with 11% of the vote.

She presented herself as a candidate for LFI, as part of the New Ecological and Social People's Union (NUPES) coalition, in the 2022 French legislative election. Tangui Kazumba served as her electoral substitute. In her campaign, she called for a shift away from industrial agriculture towards more sustainable agriculture and called for an end to austerity, including the planned healthcare cuts in her region. In the first round of the election, she more than doubled her vote share from 2017, finishing with 27,21% of the vote and making it to the second round. In the second round, she finished with 53,42% of the vote, defeating incumbent La République En Marche! deputy Yannick Kerlogot.

She currently sits on the National Defence and Armed Forces Committee.
