= Marie-Renée Oget =

French politician (born 1945)

Member of the National Assembly for Côtes-d'Armor's 4th constituency
- In office 19 June 2002 – 19 June 2012
- Preceded by: Félix Leyzour
- Succeeded by: Annie Le Houérou

Mayor of Treffrin
- In office 18 March 2001 – 30 March 2014
- Succeeded by: Étienne le Fer

Regional councillor of Brittany
- In office 1 January 1997 – 31 August 2002

Personal details
- Born: 26 January 1945 (age 81) Rostrenen, France
- Party: PS

Marie-Renée Oget (born 26 January 1945) is a French politician.

Elected to the National Assembly on 16 June 2002 for the 12th legislature (2002—2007), then re-elected on 17 June 2007 for the 13th legislature (2007—2012), Oget represented Côtes-d'Armor's 4th constituency. She was part of the Socialist, Radical and Citizen parliamentary group and a member of the cultural, familial and social affairs commission in the National Assembly.

== Summary of mandates ==
- National Assembly
  - 19 June 2002 — 19 June 2007: Deputy for Côtes-d'Armor's 4th constituency.
  - 20 June 2007 — 19 June 2012: Deputy for Côtes-d'Armor's 4th constituency.
- Regional Council of Brittany
  - 1 January 1997 — 15 March 1998: Regional councillor of Brittany.
  - 16 March 1998 — 31 August 2002: Regional councillor of Brittany.
- Mayor of Treffrin
  - 18 March 2001 — 30 March 2014: Mayor of Treffrin, Côtes-d'Armor.
- Communauté de communes du Kreiz-Breizh
  - 1998 — 2006: 1st Vice-president of the Communauté de communes du Kreiz-Breizh.
