= Carmen Sammut =

- Born: Malta
- Education: Pontifical Institute for Arabic and Islamic Studies

Sister Carmen Sammut is a Maltese Roman Catholic religious sister. She was a leader of the International Union of Superiors General (UISG) and the superior general of the Missionary Sisters of Our Lady of Africa, known as the White Sisters.

== Biography ==
Sammut was born and raised in Malta. In 1974, she joined the Missionary Sisters of Our Lady of Africa. As a missionary sister, she spent 28 years as a teacher in Algeria, Tunisia and Mauritania, all Muslim-majority countries.

Carmen studied at the Pontifical Institute for Arabic and Islamic Studies and speaks fluent Maltese, English, French and Arabic.

In 2011, she became Superior General of her order, a role she held until at least 2019.

In May 2013, Sammut was elected president of the International Union of Superiors General (UISG), succeeding Mary Lou Wirtz, superior of the Daughters of the Sacred Hearts of Jesus and Mary. Under her leadership, UISG pushed for the ordination of women as deacons, as well as a more culturally and ethnically diverse body of deacons. She also spoke out about abuse within the Church, calling for accountability and prevention. In 2015, Sammut was one of three sisters to audit the Vatican's Synod of Bishops on the family. She stepped down from the position in 2019, having served two terms.

== See also ==
- Mother Marie-Salomé (Marie-Renée Roudaut), the first Superior General of the Missionary Sisters of Our Lady of Africa
