= Sammut =

Sammut is a surname. Notable people with the surname include:

- Antoinette Cini (née Sammut; born 1993), Maltese former footballer
- Anton Sammut (born 1970), Maltese author
- Carmen Sammut, Maltese Catholic sister
- Claude Sammut, Australian computer scientist
- Davina Sammut Hili, Maltese politician
- Frans Sammut (1945–2011), Maltese novelist
- Jarrod Sammut (born 1987), Maltese rugby league player
- Kevin Sammut (born 1981), Maltese professional footballer
- Mark Anthony Sammut (born 1986), Maltese politician
- Ruben Sammut (born 1997), English professional footballer

== See also ==
- Robyn Denholm (née Sammut; born 1963), Australian executive and chairman of Tesla
- Robert Samut (1869–1934), Maltese doctor
