= Treffrin =

Treffrin Trefrin
- Commune
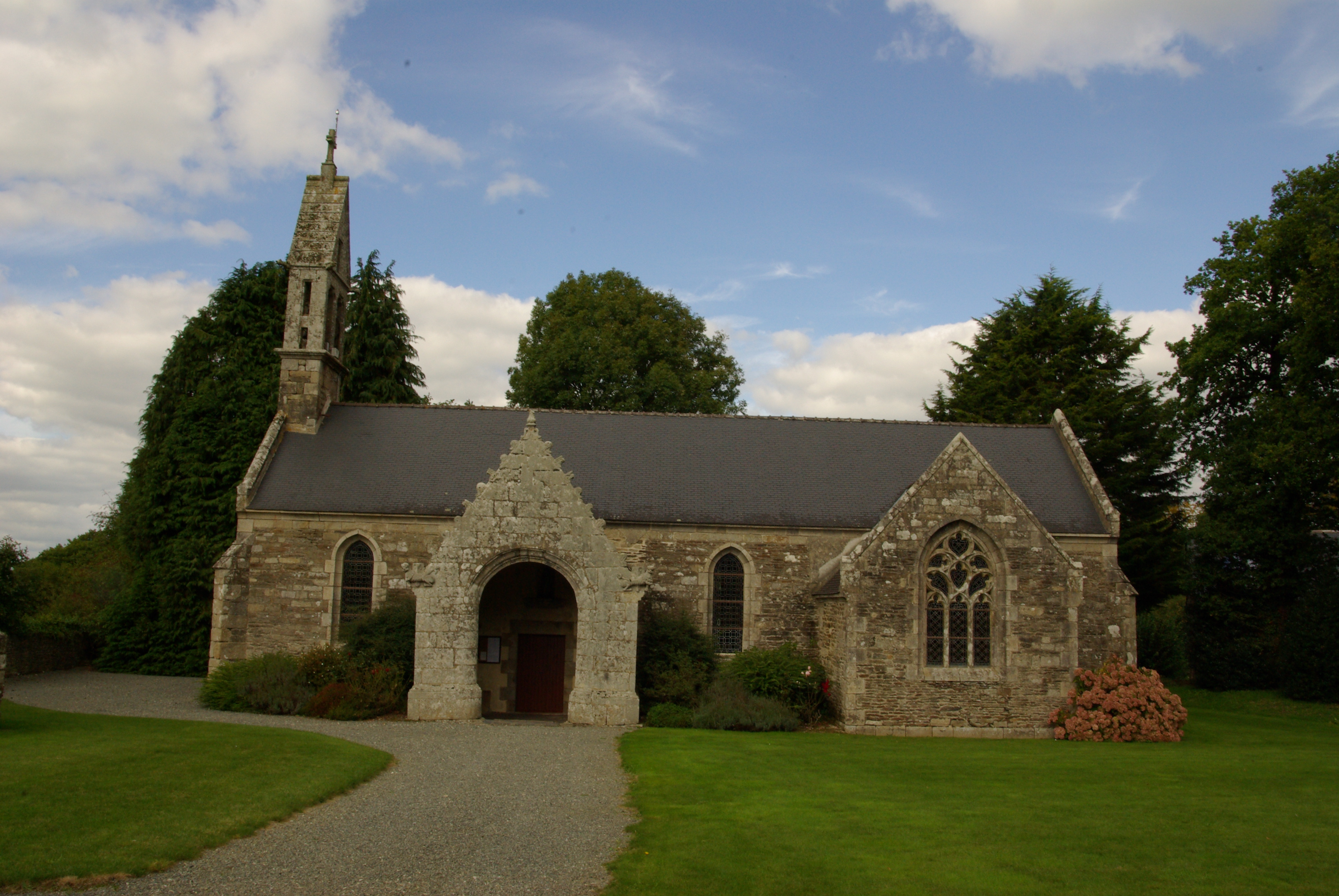
- The church in Treffrin
- Location of Treffrin
- Location within France Location within Brittany
- Coordinates: 48°17′59″N 3°30′56″W
- Country: France
- Region: Brittany
- Department: Côtes-d'Armor
- Arrondissement: Guingamp
- Canton: Rostrenen
- Intercommunality: Poher Communauté

Government
  - Mayor (2020–2026): Étienne Le Fer
- Area^{1}: 7.47 km^{2} (2.88 sq mi)
- Highest elevation: 174 m (571 ft)
- Lowest elevation: 85 m (279 ft)
- Population (2023): 516
  - Density: 69.1/km^{2} (179/sq mi)
- Time zone: UTC+01:00 (CET)
  - Summer (DST): UTC+02:00 (CEST)
- INSEE/Postal code: 22351 /22340
- ^{1} French Land Register data, which excludes lakes, ponds, glaciers > 1 km^{2} (0.386 sq mi or 247 acres) and river estuaries.

Treffrin (French pronunciation: [tʁɛfʁɛ̃]; Breton: Trefrin) is a commune in the Côtes-d'Armor department in Brittany in northwestern France.

== Population ==
Historical population
Year	Pop.	±% p.a.
1968	256	—
1975	367	+5.28%
1982	550	+5.95%
1990	608	+1.26%
1999	572	−0.68%
2007	551	−0.47%
2012	580	+1.03%
2017	548	−1.13%
2023	516	−1.00%
Source: INSEE

Inhabitants of Treffrin are called treffrinois in French.

== See also ==
- Communes of the Côtes-d'Armor department
- Goadec Sisters
