= Marie-Renée Ucciani =

French painter and sculptor

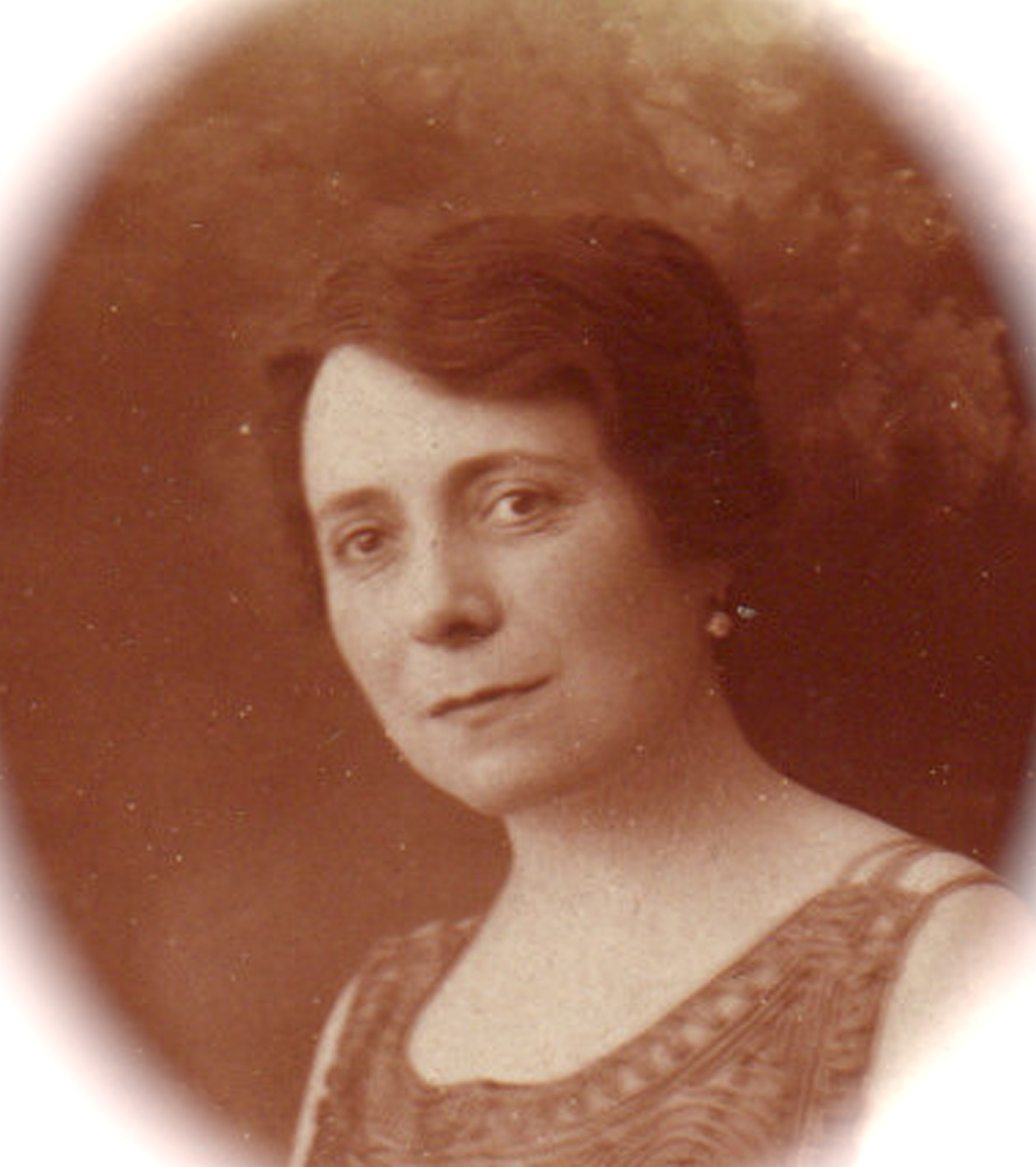
- Renée Ucciani, photo J. Oricelly (ca. 1922)
- Born: 27 March 1883; 3rd arrondissement of Paris, France
- Died: 19 February 1963 (aged 79); 17th arrondissement of Paris
- Resting place: Père Lachaise Cemetery
- Occupations: Painter; sculptor
- Organization: Société des Artistes Français
- Movement: Post-Impressionism; Fauvism
- Spouse: Georges Baudy (m. 1903, divorced)
- Father: Pierre Ucciani

Signature
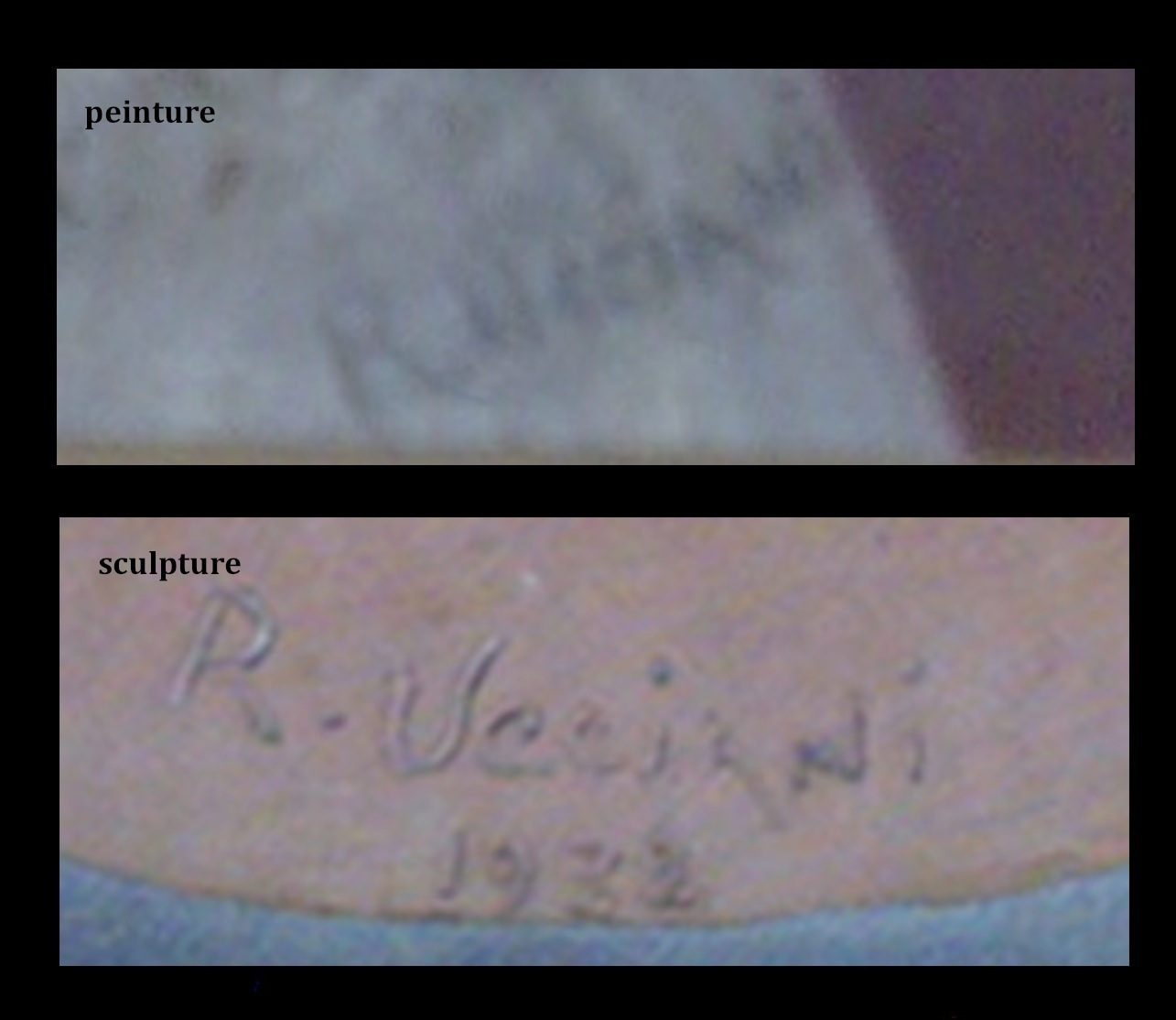

Marie-Renée Ucciani (27 March 1883 – 19 February 1963) was a French painter and sculptor. A member of the Société des Artistes Français, she exhibited in its Salon in the 1930s.

== Biography ==
Marie-Renée Ucciani was born in the 3rd arrondissement of Paris on 27 March 1883. Her father was Pierre Ucciani, a painter, jeweler and goldsmith. Her mother, Hortense (née Bégard), was an heiress and the manager of an important jeweler and goldsmith business, "Bégard H. et Cie".

In May 1903, she married Georges Baudy (1880-1960), who took over the business, "Bégard H. et Cie" on 8 February 1911. Their youngest daughter died at the age of two following a fall in the Tuileries Garden, which destabilized the marriage. Ucciani divorced and tried to forget this tragedy by painting and sculpting.

Ucciani was introduced to painting at a very young age by her father. From 1906, she painted in Villers-sur-Mer in the company of Léon Giran-Max, her cousin Élisabeth Fuss-Amoré, and her father, in a style influenced by Post-Impressionism and Fauvism.

From 1913 to 1914, Ucciani was introduced to sculpture by Paolo Troubetzkoy before his departure to the United States. From 1928 to 1939, as a student of Eugène Bénet, she made busts and bas-reliefs, for which Bénet made plaster casts and terracotting. She took her family, her friends, and her dog "Loute" as models. The Bénet couple became friends and stayed at her home, Villa Corsica in Villers-sur-Mer. In 1932, she became a member of the Société des Artistes Français and exhibited in its Salon from that year to 1939.

From 1940 to 1944, she lived in Villers-sur-Mer, in the evacuated zone, in spite of pressure from family and friends. From 1945 to 1963, living in Paris in an artist's studio at 63, boulevard Berthier, she returned to paint every spring on the Normandy coast.

She died on 19 February 1963 in her studio in the 17th arrondissement of Paris, and was buried in the Bégard family chapel in the Père Lachaise Cemetery in Paris.

== Gallery ==
Paintings by Marie-Renée Ucciani

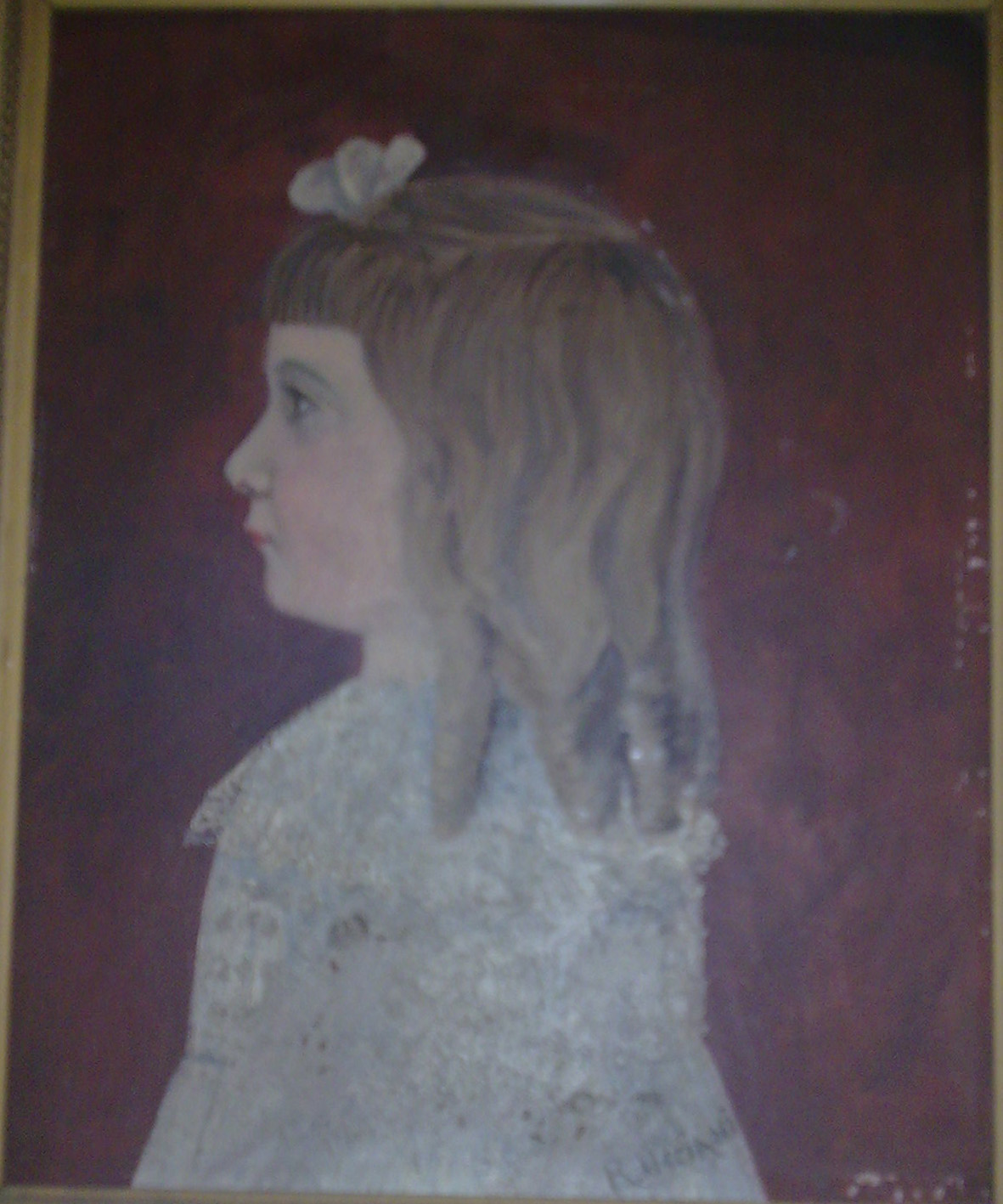
Sa fille Georgette, 1909, collection Ucciani.

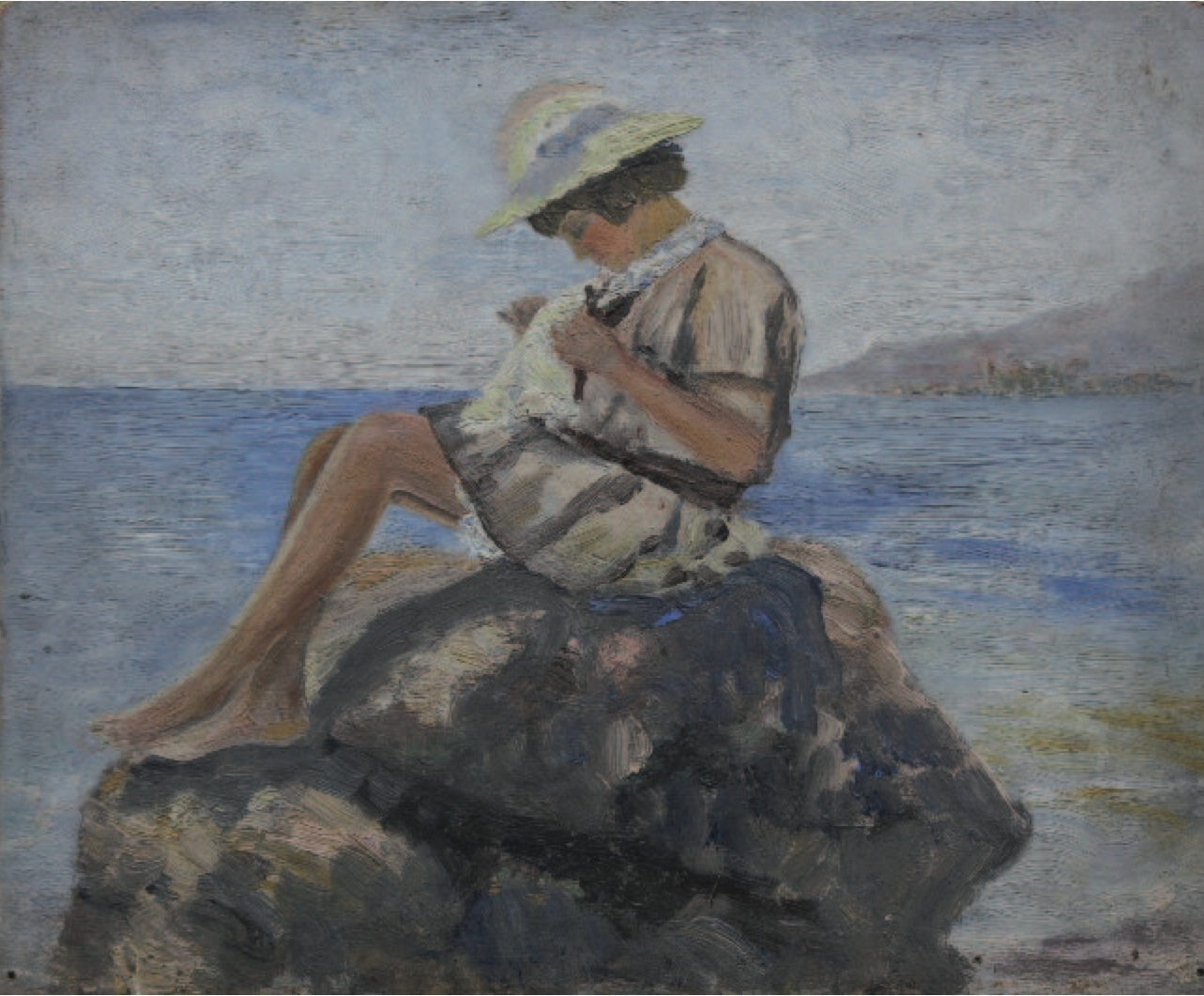
Sa fille Georgette sur un rocher, Villers-sur-Mer, 1913, collection Ucciani.

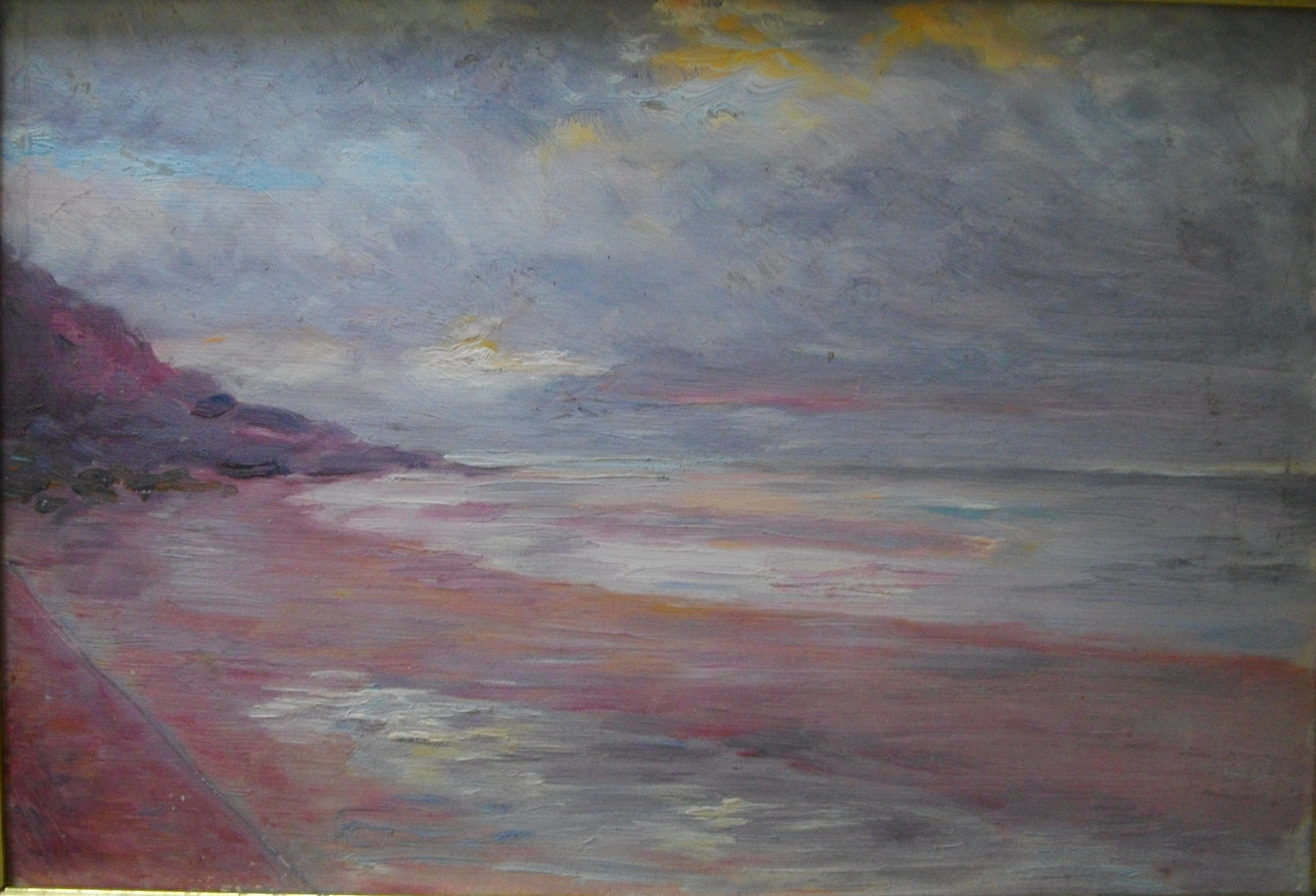
Falaise soleil couchant, Villers-sur-Mer, 1907, collection Ucciani.

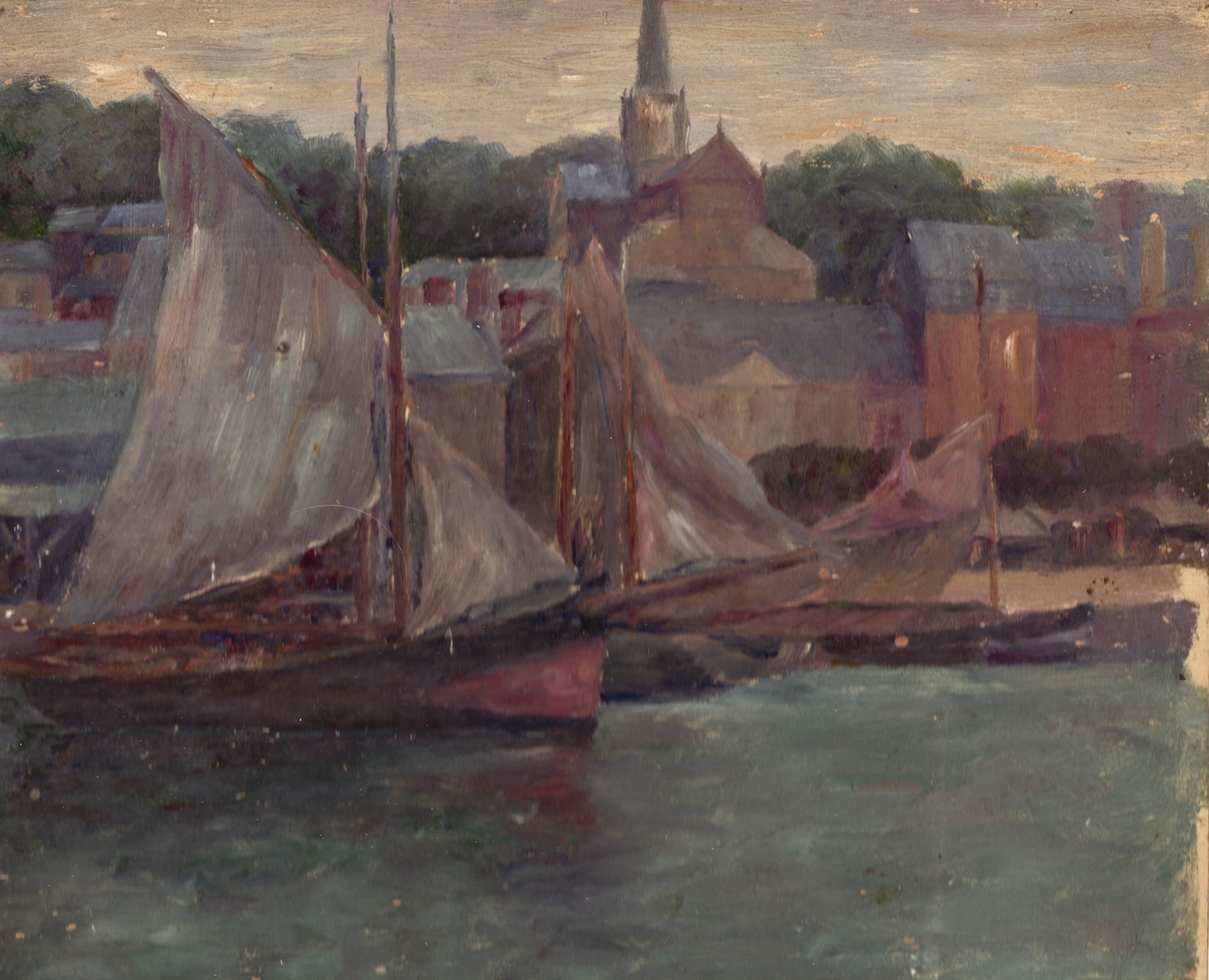
Bateaux à quai, Trouville-sur-Mer, 1920, collection Ucciani.
Sculptures by Marie-Renée Ucciani

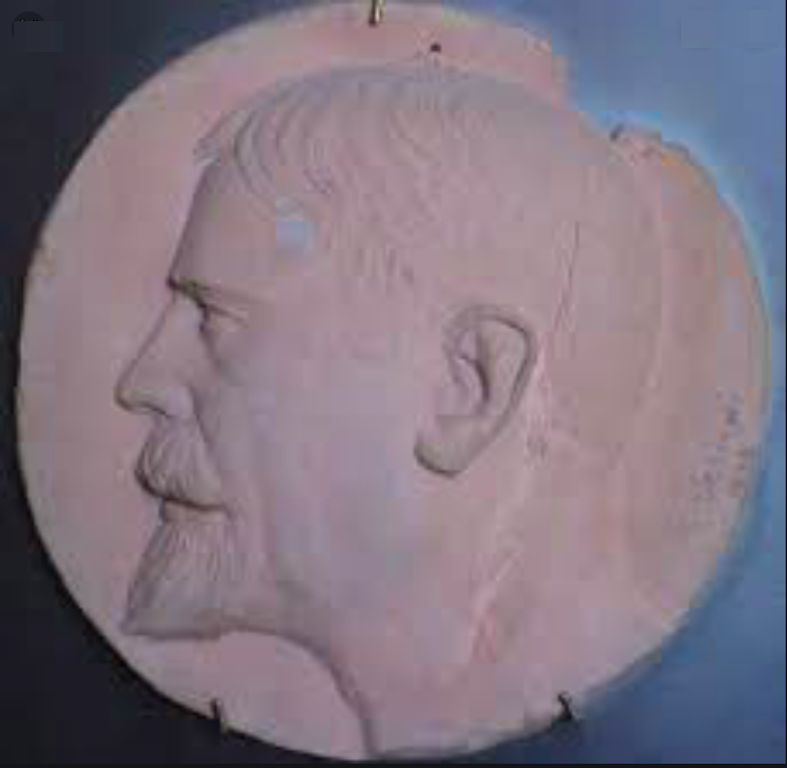
Pierre Ucciani (1932), collection Ucciani.

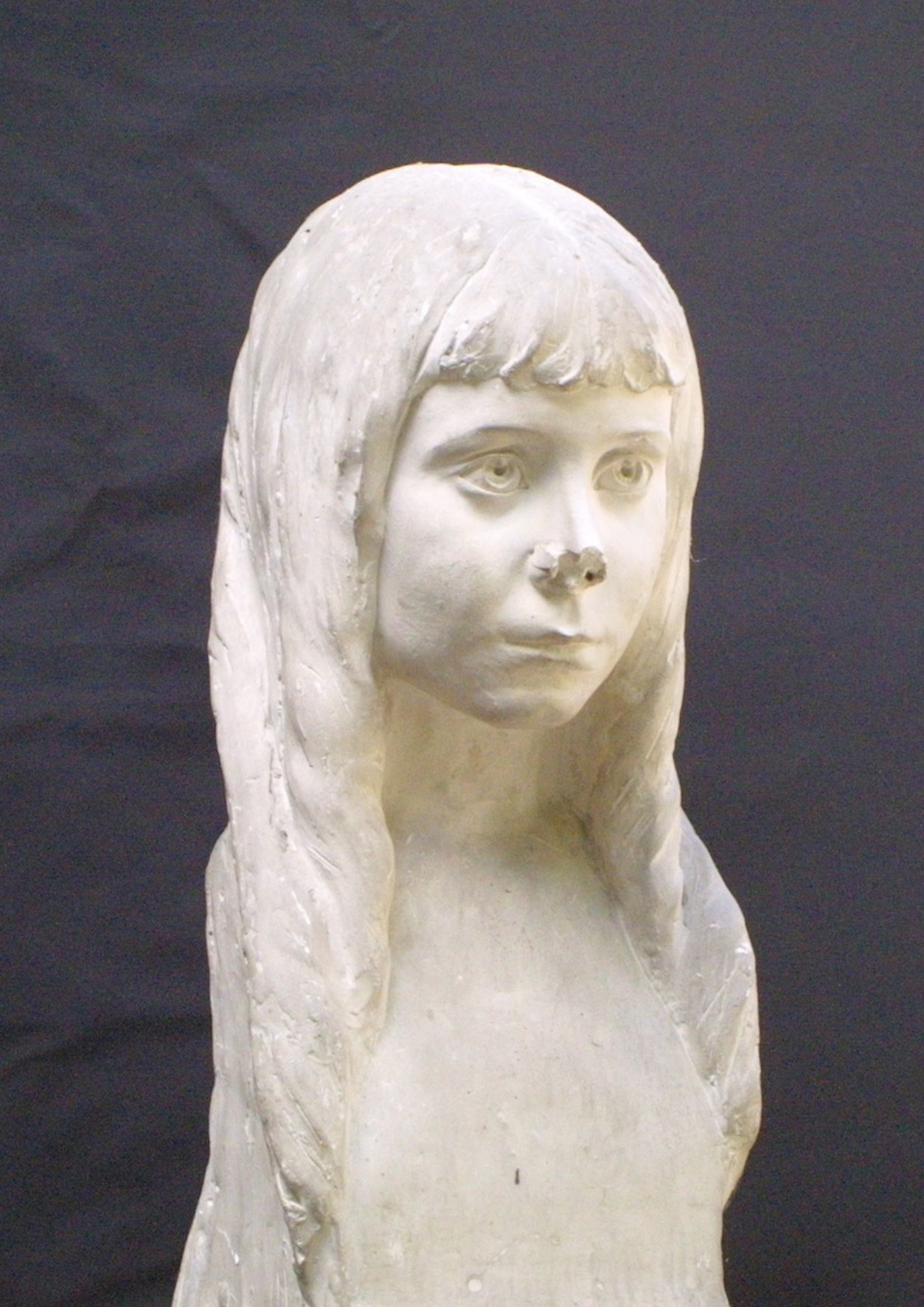
Georgette Baudy (1914), collection Ucciani.

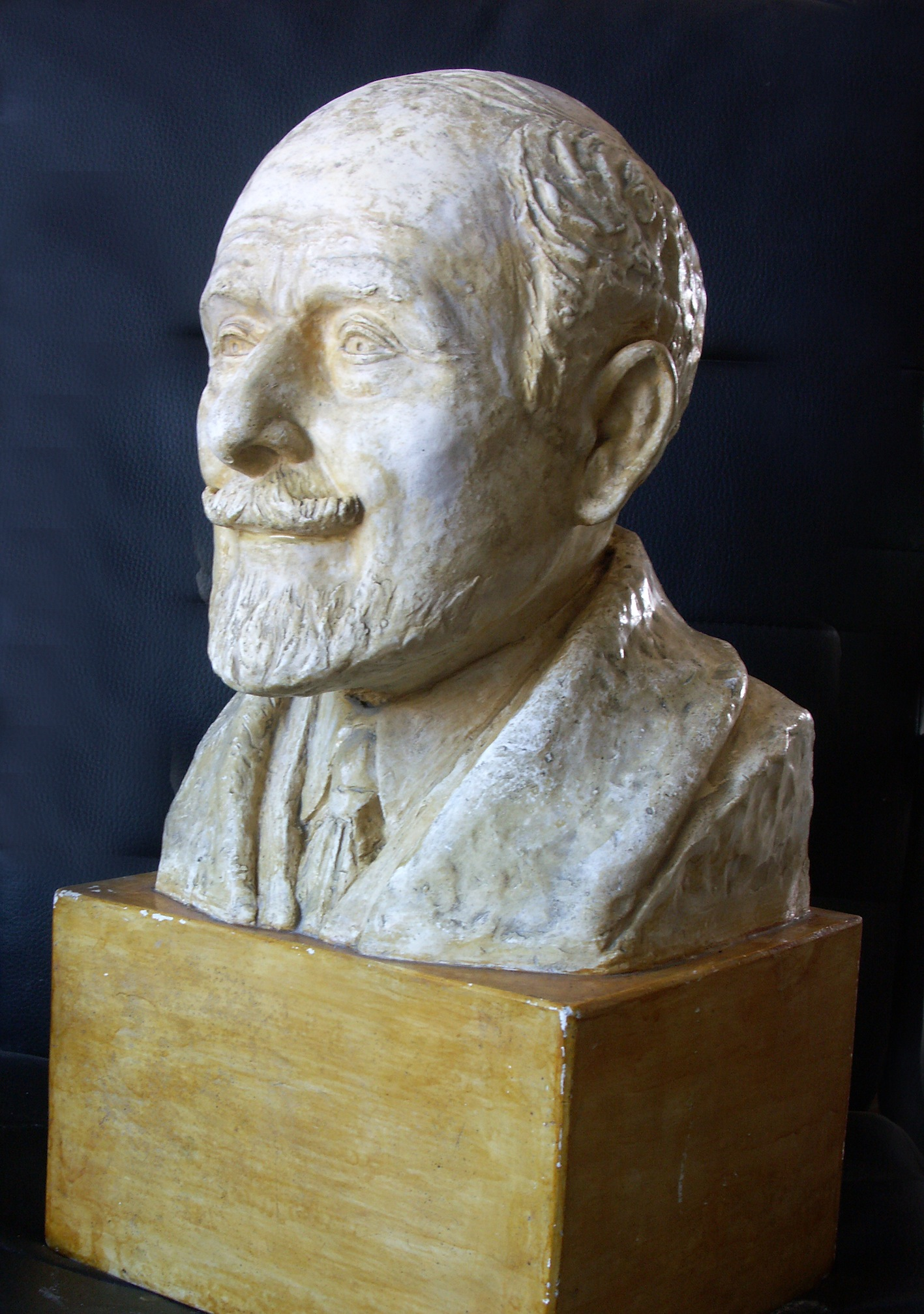
Pierre Ucciani (vers 1932), collection Ucciani.

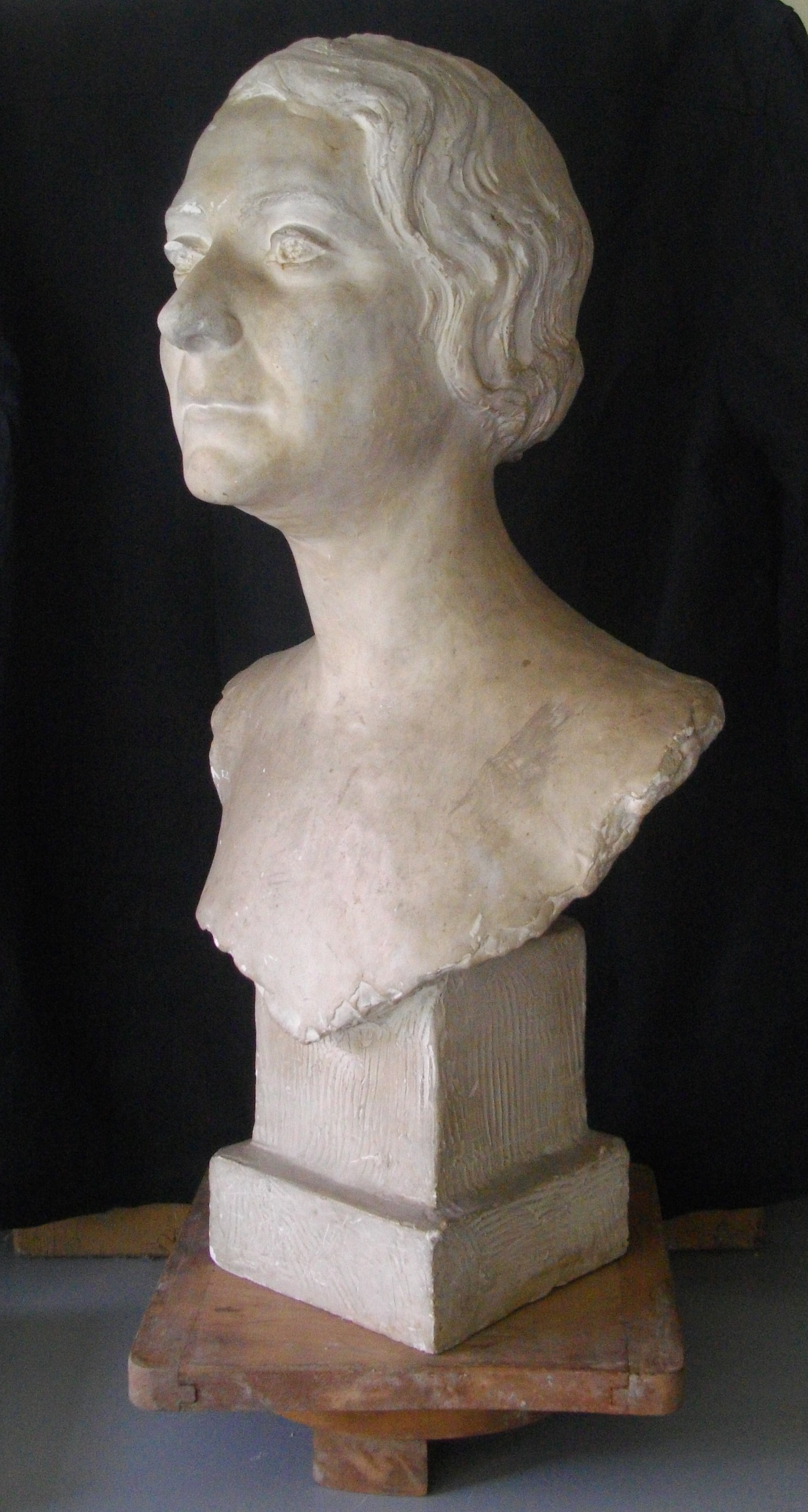
Georgette Baudy (1935), collection Ucciani.

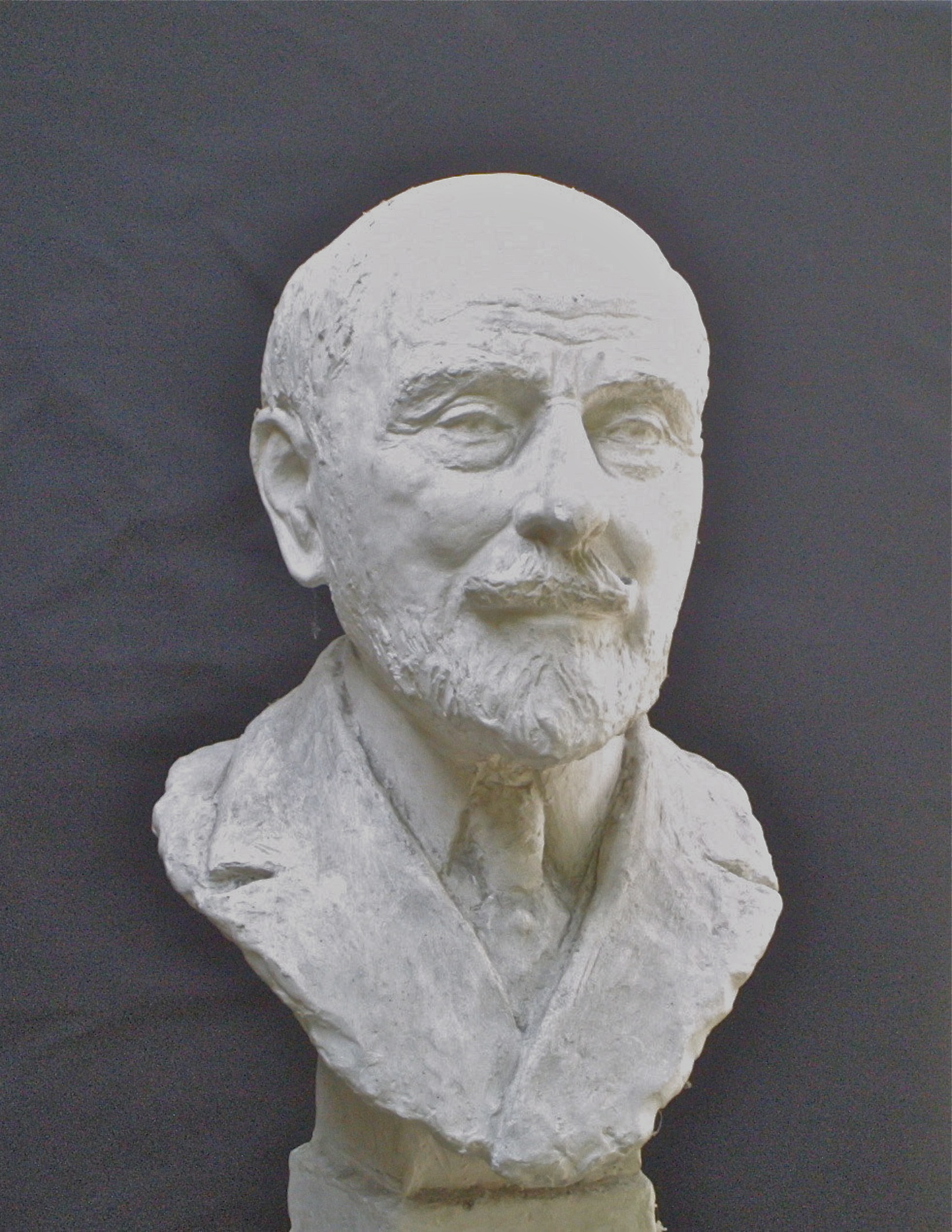
Pierre Ucciani (1936), collection Ucciani.

== Bibliography ==
- Dutour, Françoise; Egnell, Karin, Villers et ses peintres (1858-1930), (catalogue d'exposition), Imprimerie Moderne de Bayeux, 2014.
- Egnell, Karin, Ucciani à Villers, Le Pays d'Auge (société savante), October 2012 ISSN 1149-3305
- Egnell, Karin, Eugène Bénet et le Poilu victorieux, Le Pays d'Auge (société savante), November–December 2014 ISSN 1149-3305
- Giansily, Pierre-Claude, Histoire de la peinture en Corse aux XIXe et XXe siècles. Dictionnaire des peintres, June 2010 ISBN 978-2-915922-36-3
- Nigaglioni, Michel-Édouard, Encyclopédie des Peintres actifs en Corse, Éditions Alain Piazzola, 2013 ISBN 978-2-915410-93-8
- Catalogue illustré du Salon des artistes français, 1933
- L'art de vivre à Villers au XIXe et XXe siècle, Ouest-France (Pays d'Auge), 18 June 2014 ISSN 0999-2138
- Peintres du Pays d'Auge, Journées du Patrimoine, Le Pays d'Auge et Ouest-France (Pays d'Auge), September 2010 ISSN 0999-2138
- Villers et ses peintres (évènement), Ouest-France (Pays d'Auge), 12 June 2014 ISSN 0999-2138
