= Marie-Renée Roudaut =

- Born: 3 March 1847; Guissény, Brittany, France
- Died: 18 October 1930 (aged 83); Kouba, Algeria
- Other names: Mother Marie-Salomé
- Occupation: Missionary
- Known for: Superior General of the Missionary Sisters of Our Lady of Africa

Marie-Renée Roudaut (3 March 1847 – 18 October 1930) was a Catholic missionary nun. With the name Mother Marie-Salomé she was the first Superior General of the Missionary Sisters of Our Lady of Africa (White Sisters).

== Early years ==
Marie-Renée Roudaut was born in Guissény, Brittany, France, on 3 March 1847 to a farming family. She was the sixth child of René Roudaut and Marie-Jeanne Lessec. Her cousin was one of the first nuns to go to Algeria to assist the Archbishop of Algeria, Charles Lavigerie, in running the diocesan orphanages. Her cousin could not complete her novitiate due to poor health, but returned to Brittany where she talked to Roudaut, who decided to join the congregation.

== Missionary ==
In October 1871 Roudaut left for the Postulate of Vans, at the age of twenty four. On 26 January 1874 she arrived in Algeria where she was assigned to the orphanage of St Charles at Kouba, Algeria, now a suburb of Algiers. She received the habit on 23 June 1872 as Sister Marie-Salomé, and made her first profession on 6 July 1873. On 23 January 1874 she was sent to the mission of St Cyprien of the Attafs, a village for orphans whom the church had raised to adulthood. She was recalled to St Charles in November 1877, and in March 1878 was sent to a new mission at Ouadhias, Kabylia. On 21 October 1879 she was elected Assistant General of the order. In 1880 she was appointed head of the novitiate.

== Superior General ==
At the third General Chapter of the society, on 14 September 1882 Mother Marie-Salomé was elected Superior General of the "Sœurs Enseignantes et Hospitalières de Notre Dame des Missions d’Afrique". New rules were promulgated for the congregation, similar to those of the White Fathers. On 6 April 1885 Lavigerie, now a Cardinal, dissolved the congregation and relegated its members to the Attafs. He felt the sisters, many of whom were poorly educated, were not qualified for responsible missionary work. Other concerns were the lack of money, difficulty obtaining equipment, difficulties of recruitment and a scandal caused by the defection of one nun. Mother Salomé managed to persuade Lavigerie to reverse his decision, and on 9 February 1886 the novitiate and Mother House were returned to St Charles. In September of that year she was unanimously reelected as Superior General of the congregation.

During the summer of 1887 Mother Salomé opened postulates at Lyon, France, and Maastricht, the Netherlands. In November 1887 she transferred the novitiate and Mother House to Carthage, Tunisia. In 1888 Rome issued a Decree of praise of the Congregation of the "Missionary Sisters of Our Lady of the Missions of Africa", followed by approval of the society's constitution for five years. That year Mother Salomé traveled in Europe, Algeria, Tunisia and Canada. In June 1890 the novitiate and Mother House returned to St Charles, Algiers. On 13 December 1893 the congregation was finally given autonomy under the Sacred Congregation of Propaganda Fide. Rome decreed that the Superior General had full authority for government of the society.

Under the leadership of Marie Salome the congregation provided a wide range of services to the people in Algeria including running dispensaries, training housewives and providing schools. The first Caravan to the Equator left of 12 June 1894, and the first Caravan to Sudan left on 23 October 1897. Throughout the years that followed Mother Salomé continued to be reelected as Superior General. She ceased traveling due to poor health in 1917, and resigned on 28 June 1925. Mother Salomé died at St Charles on 18 October 1930 at the age of 83.
