= Lusinga lwa Ng'ombe =

Lusinga Iwa Ng'ombe
- Born: c. 1840; Buluba
- Died: 1884; Congo Free State
- Occupation: Slaver

Lusinga Iwa Ng'ombe (c. 1840–1884) was a slave trader in the region to the west of Lake Tanganyika in the 1870s and early 1880s.

== Early years ==
Lusinga was born around 1840 in "Buluba", the lands to the northeast of Lubanda that were inhabited by the eastern Luba people. He came from the Sanga ("Bushpig") clan. At some time Lusinga seems to have visited Unyanyembe, near Tabora in modern Tanzania, where he realized the value that was attached to slaves and ivory. He obtained muskets, or armed retainers, and was the first to use firearms in the region west of the lake. With this superior weaponry he quickly defeated the chiefs in the region of Cape Tembwe, a key point for the trade crossing Lake Tanganyika, and settled there in a fortified village. After reducing the local population by his slaving activity, and under pressure from other slavers, he moved to a new base two days walk from Lubanda in the Mugandja mountains, on the Muswe tributary of the Lufuko River. By the end of his career, Lusinga had sixty wives. These provided a useful labor force for agricultural work, giving Lusinga increased wealth.

== Contact with Europeans ==
The British explorer Joseph Thomson met Lusinga in 1879. He described him as a "sanguinary potentate" due to the ruthlessness with which he captured slaves for the East African trade. The Belgian soldier Émile Storms was given the task of establishing a Belgian base on the west shore of Lake Tanganyika. He reached Mompara on the west shore of the lake in April 1883. He met the chief Mpala, who gave permission to build the post in his territory. On 4 May 1883 the foundations of the station of Mpala were laid. Chief Mpala and Storms became blood-brothers in a ceremony on 25 June 1883. Lusinga was present at this ceremony.

To consolidate his power in the region, during 1884 and 1885 Storms made a series of attacks on Lusinga and his supporters. He pillaged their villages and took the loot back to his fort at Mpala, where some of it was lost when the fort burned down. In November 1884, while in Karema, Storms heard that Lusinga was preparing to make war on Mpala. Storms dispatched a force of his men and men from Paul Reichard's expedition to defeat Lusinga. They managed to bluff their way into Lusinga's fortress, where they shot him and took his head, which is held in the Museum of Natural Sciences of Belgium.

== Legacy ==
Storms replaced Lusinga as chief by Ukala the Nyamwezi, one of Storms' allies. Storms collected a standing figure of Lusinga during a raid on his village in 1884. The figure, in the Luba style, is designed to display his new royal status. It is held in the Royal Museum for Central Africa in Tervuren, Belgium. Storms also brought Lusinga's skull to Europe when he returned, and gave it to the anthropologist Émile Houzé, who wrote a treatise on the subject in which he saw "degeneracy" in the skull.
