= Ficus pendula =

Ficus pendula may refer to two different species of plants:

- Ficus pendula Welw. ex Hiern, a taxonomic synonym for Ficus asperifolia, native to Africa
- Ficus pendula Link, a taxonomic synonym for Ficus benjamina, native to Australia and Asia
