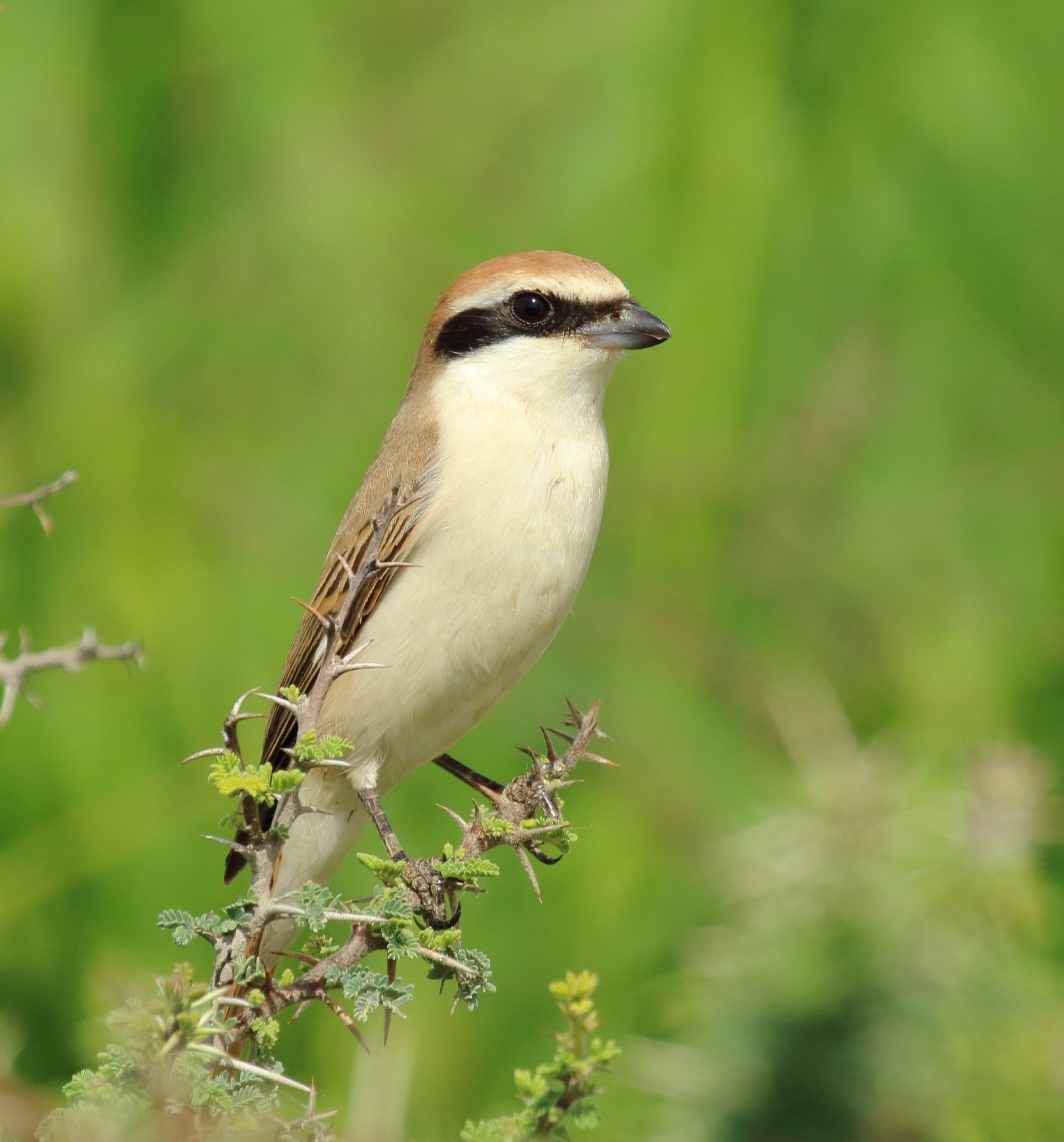

Conservation status
- Least Concern (IUCN 3.1)

Scientific classification
- Kingdom: Animalia
- Phylum: Chordata
- Class: Aves
- Order: Passeriformes
- Family: Laniidae
- Genus: Lanius
- Species: L. phoenicuroides

Binomial name
- Lanius phoenicuroides (Schalow, 1875)
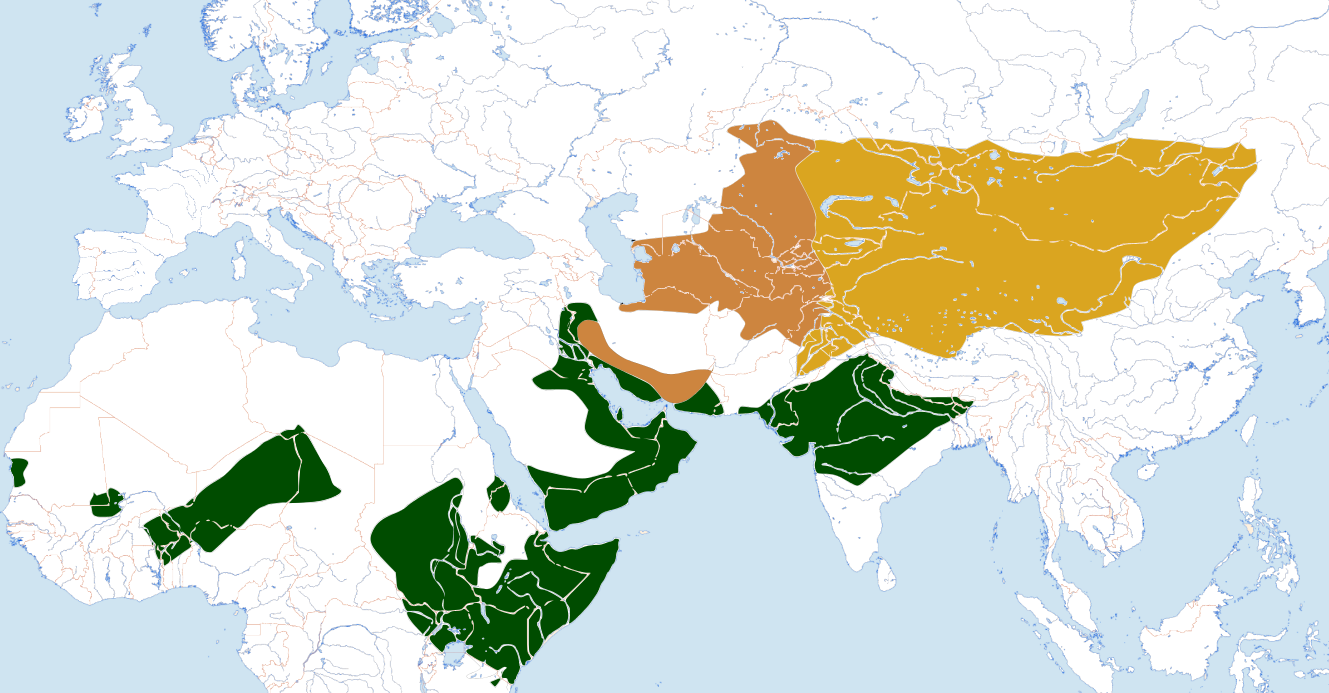
- Breeding range of Lanius (isabellinus) phoenicuroides Breeding range of Lanius isabellinus Overwintering range

= Red-tailed shrike =

Species of bird

The red-tailed shrike or Turkestan shrike (Lanius phoenicuroides) is a member of the shrike family (Laniidae). It was formerly considered conspecific with the isabelline shrike and the red-backed shrike.

== Description ==
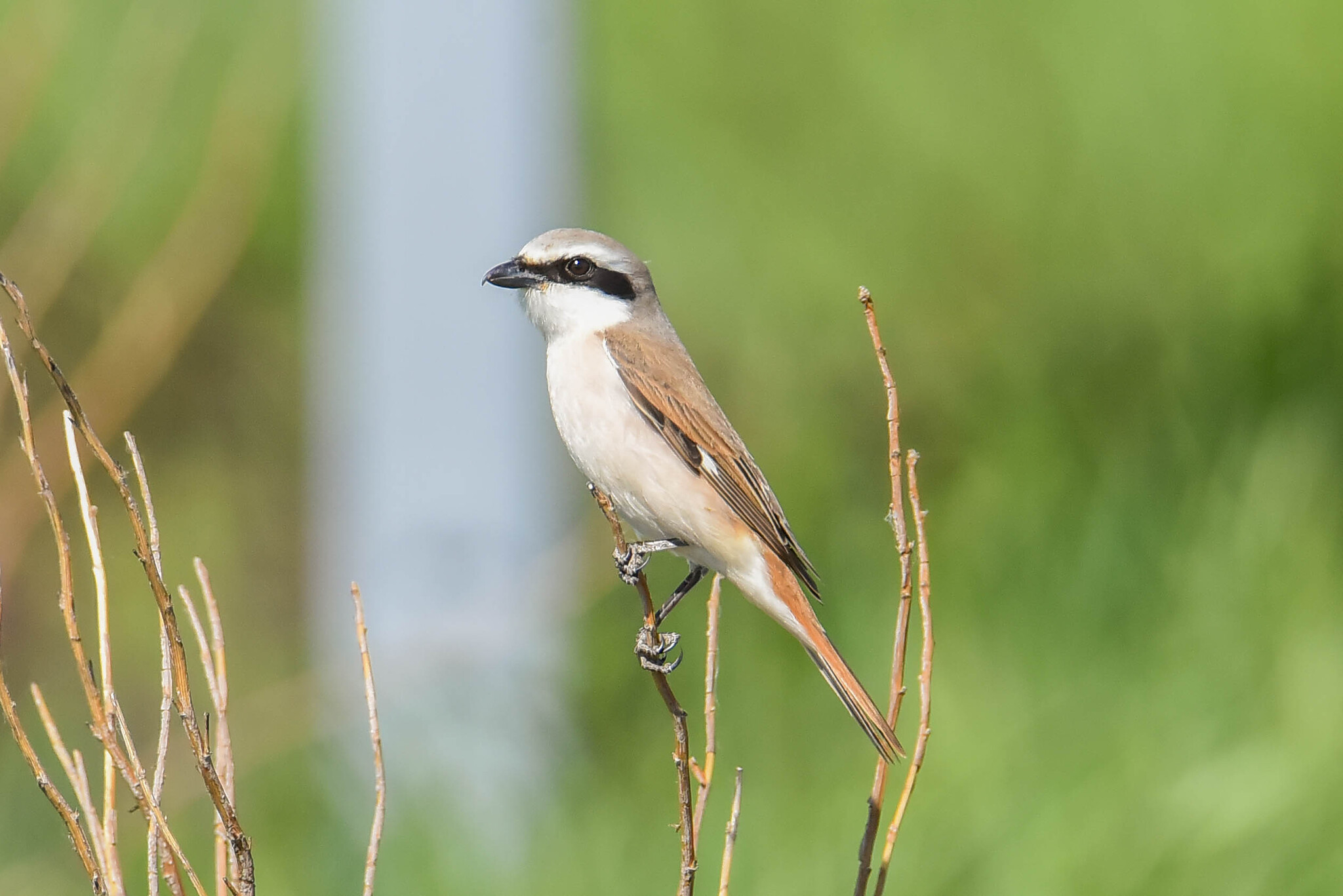
Female bird

The plumage is a sandy colour. It has a red tail.

== Range ==
The red-tailed shrike breeds in south Siberia and Central Asia.

== Habits ==
This migratory medium-sized passerine eats large insects, small birds, rodents and lizards. Like other shrikes it hunts from prominent perches, and impales corpses on thorns or barbed wire as a larder. It breeds in open cultivated country, preferably with thorn bushes.

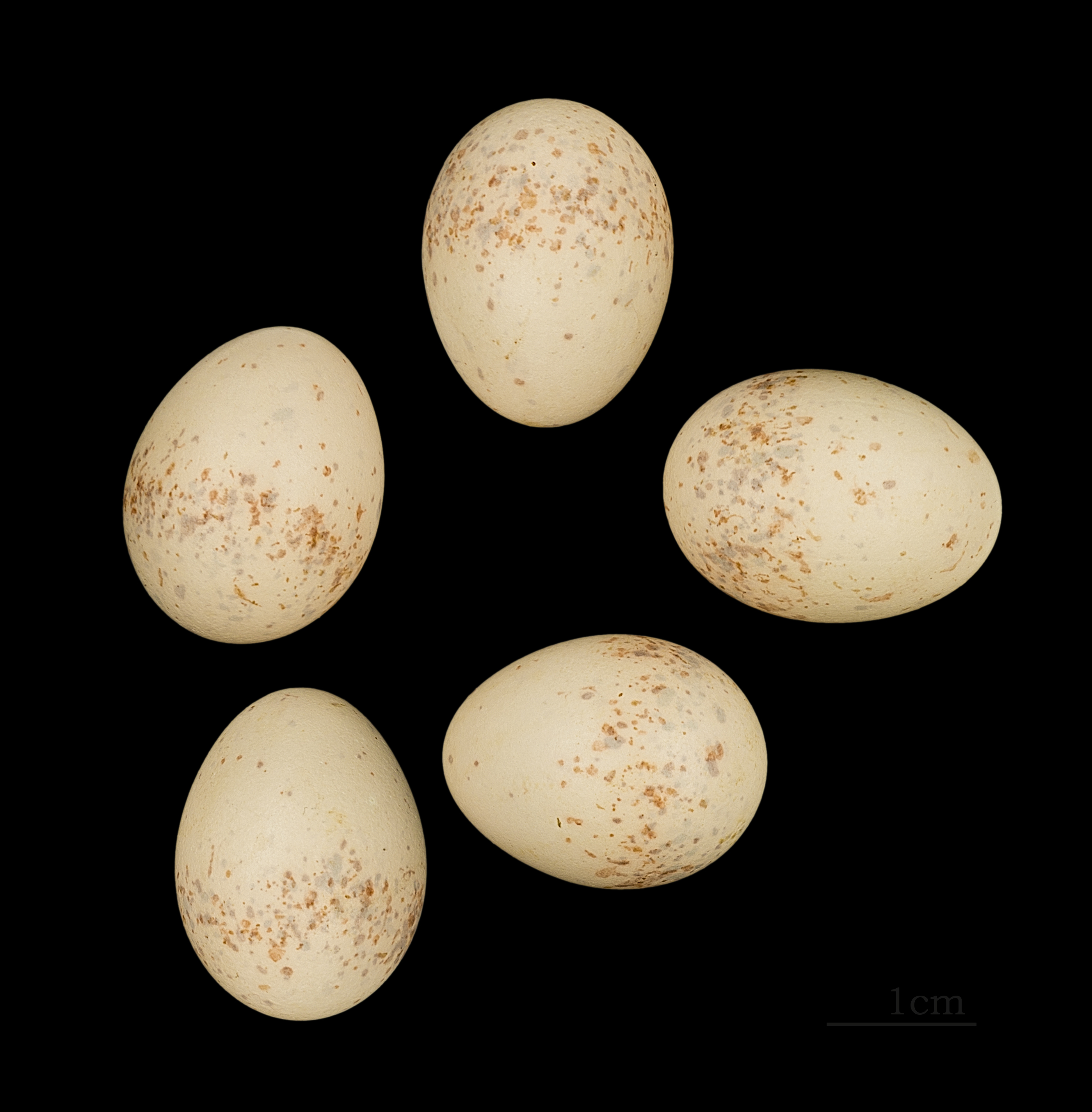
Eggs MHNT
