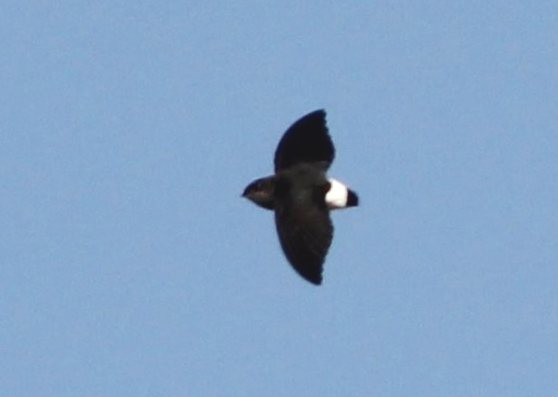

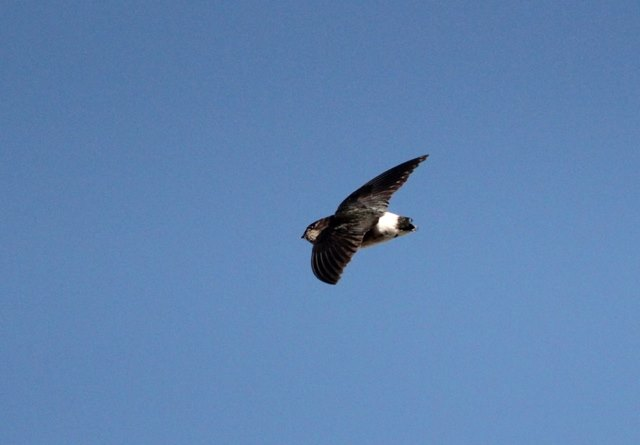
- Böhm's spinetails in southern Mozambique

Conservation status
- Least Concern (IUCN 3.1)

Scientific classification
- Kingdom: Animalia
- Phylum: Chordata
- Class: Aves
- Clade: Strisores
- Order: Apodiformes
- Family: Apodidae
- Genus: Neafrapus
- Species: N. boehmi

Binomial name
- Neafrapus boehmi (Schalow, 1882)

= Böhm's spinetail =

Species of bird

Böhm's spinetail, also Bohm's spinetail or Boehm's spinetail, (Neafrapus boehmi), also known as the bat-like spinetail, is a species of swift in the family Apodidae.

It is found in Angola, Botswana, DRC, Kenya, Malawi, Mozambique, Namibia, Somalia, South Africa, Tanzania, Zambia, and Zimbabwe. It occurs in the vicinity of Baobab trees and nests in cavities in the trees.

The name of this bird commemorates the German zoologist Richard Böhm.
