= Lufuko River =

Location
- Country: Democratic Republic of the Congo
- Province: Tanganyika Province

Physical characteristics
- Mouth
  - coordinates: 6.734295°S 29.530649°E
  - elevation: 773 m (2,536 ft)

Basin features
- River system: Ruzizi River

The Lufuko River (or Lufuku) is a river in the Democratic Republic of the Congo that empties into Lake Tanganyika beside the village of Mpala in Tanganyika Province (formerly Katanga Province).

== Geography ==
The Lufuko drains part of the Marungu highlands. There have been proposals to conserve the forests above 1,500 metres (4,900 ft) that border the Mulobozi River and Lufuko River into nature preserve areas.

Theo Kassner travelled through the region in 1909. He reached the Tanganyika watershed at Mount Giambe. He recorded:

Camp was made in the great Lufuko Valley at the base of the mountain. The Lufuko River is about 100 feet across and winds through rugged gorges northwards to Tanganyika Lake. I chose to follow this valley in order to reach the great inland sea. After six miles' marching and at an altitude of 4700 feet we entered a cluster of thickly populated villages, and finally reached the river, with its flat, sandy banks covered with bamboo reeds. We had to cross the river, and on the other side numerous hillocks of varying heights and shape line the valley. Following the river, our road lay down these heights, past villages and patches of cultivated lands, masses of boulders, rugged cliffs, morasses, and numerous streams, always descending gradually to the north. The valley is bounded both right and left by imposing and rugged mountain chains, rising menacingly against the horizon.

== Fish ==
A species of catfish locally called ndjagali use the river for spawning from September to November. The fish are considered a delicacy by the people of the region. In the past they were owned and caught communally, and traded with other communities for salt or iron. The people considered that the spirit of the earth, Kaomba, caused them to multiply.

The catfish were a major source of food for the villagers, but over-fishing around the end of the nineteenth century significantly reduced the numbers. In the mid-1970s the local villagers still caught the fish in weirs until the rainy season began, when the weirs were destroyed and the fish could pass to breeding areas higher up the river.

Captain Émile Storms established a station named "Mpala" at the mouth of the Lufuko River in May 1883. The station was established at the village of Lubanda, and was named after the local chief.

When missionaries took over the post in 1885 they recognized the beliefs about Kaomba and identified the sacred parts of the river. For many years they controlled access to the river, using it for their own food or to reward those loyal to them.

With technological advances at the start of the twentieth century it became possible to fish the lake far from the shores, and fishing became an individual occupation.
