= Cape Tembwe =

Lake promontory in the Democratic Republic of the Congo

- Cape
- Interactive map of Cape Tembwe
- Coordinates: 6°31′05″S 29°29′02″E
- Location: Democratic Republic of the Congo
- Offshore water bodies: Lake Tanganyika
- Elevation: 940 m (3,080 ft)

Cape Tembwe is a promontory on the west shore of Lake Tanganyika, in the Democratic Republic of the Congo.

The cape rises to a peak with an elevation of about 940 metres (3,080 ft), above the lake level of 773 metres (2,536 ft).

The Scottish explorer Joseph Thomson visited the region in December 1879. Traveling north, he found the countryside fertile and the people prosperous. He was given a hospitable reception by Sultan Mpala at Lubanda (Mpala). Cape Tembwe is about six hours' walk north of Mpala. When Thomson reached the cape he found the countryside devastated by the effects of slave raiding by a chief known as Lusinga. The large village at Tembwe was full of refugees.

The region along the lake shore from Cape Tembwe south into Zambia and inland into the Marungu massif is inhabited by Tabwa people. North of the cape the people identify themselves as Holoholo.
