= Kiymbi Dam =

Kiymbi
- Location within Democratic Republic of the Congo
- Official name: Barrage de la Kyimbi
- Country: Democratic Republic of the Congo
- Location: South Kivu Province
- Coordinates: 5.033544°S 28.949178°E
- Purpose: Hydroelectricity
- Opening date: 1959

Dam and spillways
- Height: 12.0 m (39.4 ft)
- Length: 60 m (200 ft)
- Elevation at crest: 1,652.2 m (5,421 ft)

Reservoir
- Total capacity: 75,000 m^{3} (2,600,000 cu ft)

Power Station
- Hydraulic head: 677 m (2,221 ft)
- Installed capacity: 17,200 kW (23,100 hp) (max. planned is 44-59 MW)

The Kiymbi Dam [aka Bendera Hydroelectric Powerstation] is a major hydroelectric dam and power station that was opened on the Kiymbi (or Kyimbi) river in 1959. It has been neglected and requires rehabilitation. New initiatives have been undertaken to rehabilitate the dam.

== Kyimbi River ==
The Kyimbi River originates in the Mugandja plateau at a height of 6,560 feet (2,000 m). It contains a series of falls over a distance of 2 miles (3.2 km), with the largest 300 to 500 feet (91 to 152 m) high. The total drop in this section is over 2,500 feet (760 m). They are among the highest falls in the African continent to be used for power generation. In the dry season the average flow is 3 to 10 cubic metres per second (110 to 350 cu ft/s), but this rises to 150 cubic metres per second (5,300 cu ft/s) in the rainy season.

== Planning ==
In 1948 it was reported that a company had been formed to build a hydroelectric plant on the Kyimbi river in the north of Katanga, to supply Albertville (now called Kalemie). Operations were expected to start in 1950. The plant was to be built near Bendera. This is about 110 kilometres (68 mi) from Albertville. There were delays. A 1952 report said that construction was still planned. A 1954 report described the planned structure as a dam 14.5 metres (48 ft) high that would provide water to five generating units, each with 8,250-kilowatt (11,060 hp) capacity, or 41,250 kilowatts (55,320 hp) in total.

The plant was eventually built and operated by the Forces de L'Est du Congo (FEC), a company that began operations in 1955 to provide power to the eastern Congo. It began delivering power from two of the five planned turbines in 1959. Additional turbines were to be installed as needed to meet demand. The architect Eugene Palumbo, assigned to the Congo by UNESCO, designed the service city of the dam construction project.

== Dam and power plant ==
The dam is above the main Kiymbi waterfalls and consists of a concrete arc 60 metres (200 ft) in length, with a crest altitude of 1,652.2 metres (5,421 ft). The dam's capacity is about 75,000 cubic metres (61 acre⋅ft). Water is carried away from the dam in a horizontal direction along a 1,428 metres (4,685 ft) covered channel, or gallery, to a point above the power station. The gallery is partially lined with concrete, with a width of 3.5 metres (11 ft) where it is lined and 4.5 metres (15 ft) where it is unlined. The gallery terminates in a de-sanding chamber 30 metres (98 ft) long and 7 metres (23 ft) in diameter which eliminates any sand particles larger than .03 millimetres (0.0012 in) in diameter. The sand is flushed down a gully to the river below.

From a tank at the end of the de-sander, the water is fed to the power plant by a steep conduit 1,400 metres (4,600 ft) long with a diameter decreasing from 1.1 to .9 metres (3 ft 7 in to 2 ft 11 in). The drop is about 677 metres (2,221 ft). The water powers the turbines and is discharged into the river below the waterfalls. The power station came online in 1959 with two 8,250 kilowatt generators, with potential for three more of the same capacity. A 132 kV line carried the electricity to Albertville.[since 1971 called Kalemie].

== Rehabilitation plans ==
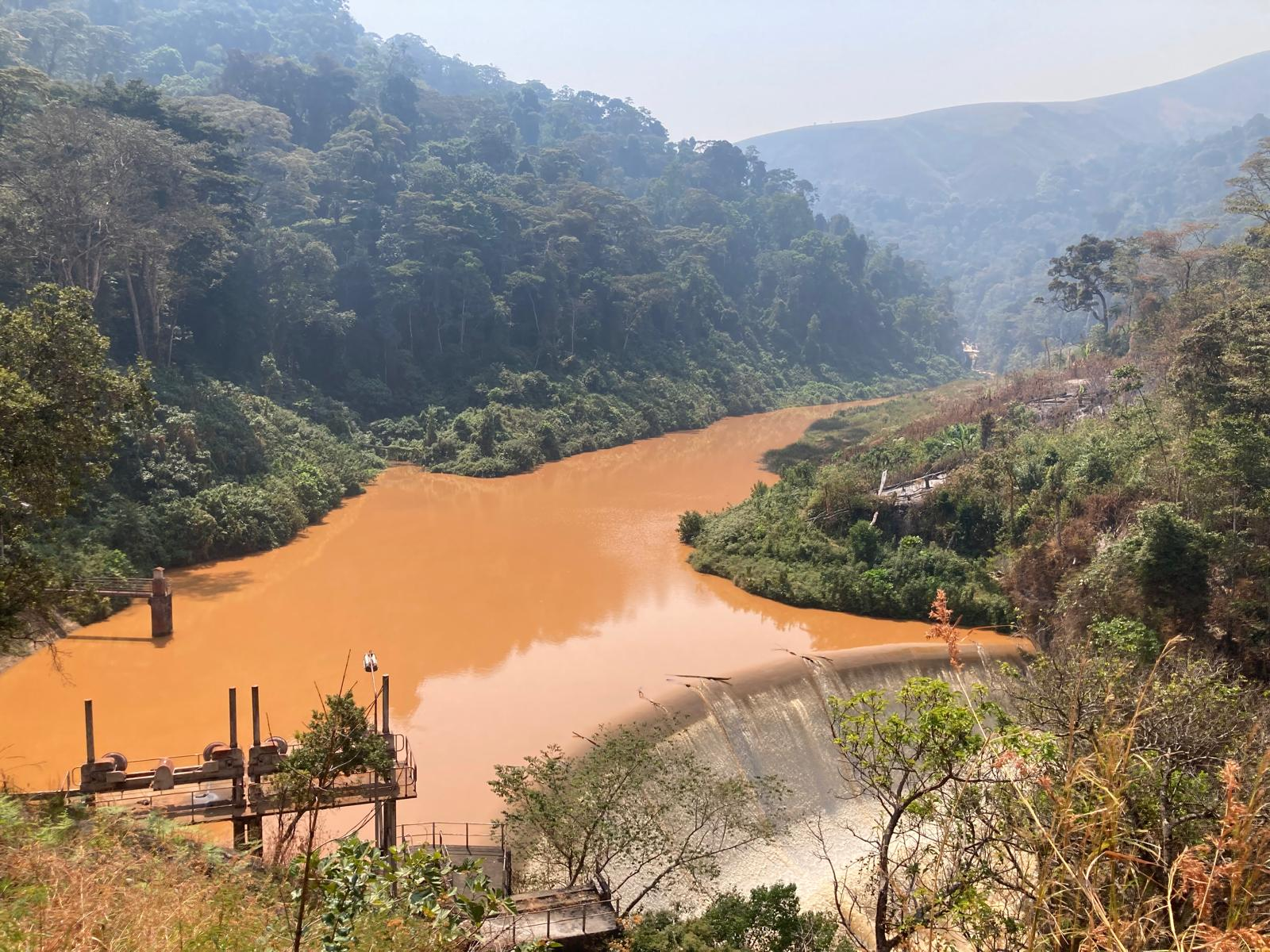
Bendera dam on Kyimbi River in Tanganyika Province of Democratic Republic of Congo. The dam is the upper facility of the Bendera Hydroelectric Power Plant.

The Democratic Republic of the Congo became independent in June 1960. The state electricity company, Société nationale d'électricité (SNEL), prepared a study of rehabilitating the Kiymbi power station in 1992. A 2007 report prepared for the World Bank evaluated rehabilitation of the power plant. The very rough estimate of cost from a "reconnaissance" study would be US$52.06 million for 43 MW installed capacity. The report recommended making a priority of a more detailed study.

In 2023, a British company [Dynamis Investment Partners Ltd] took over the rehabilitation plans for the Bendera hydroelectric plant and is currently conducting a feasibility study for the project, in collaboration with SNEL.

The rehabilitation work is scheduled to begin in early 2026, with plans to increase the plant's capacity significally beyond its current output, as well as improving the plant's reliability and working conditions. An EPC Contractor, [ABC Contracting SA] with head office in Andenne (BE) is appointed for the work.

This project is expected to provide increased access to green energy and electricity for communities in Kalemie and areas surrounding the power plant, boosting growth in the region. The operation of the power plant is planned to be run, via a lease agreement with SNEL, by the Congolese company Bendera Hydroélectricité SARL [subsidiary to UK based company Bendera HPP Ltd].
