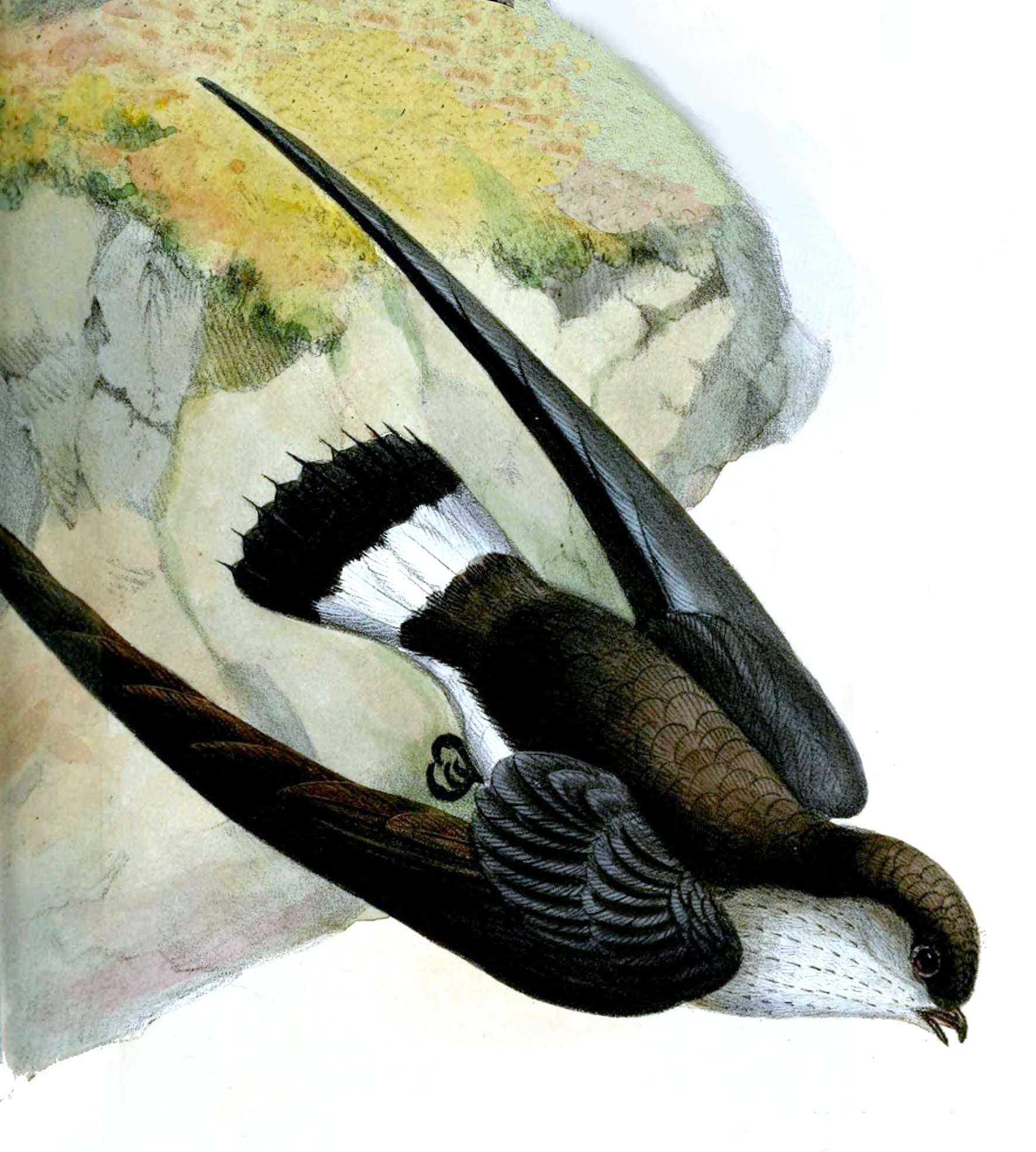

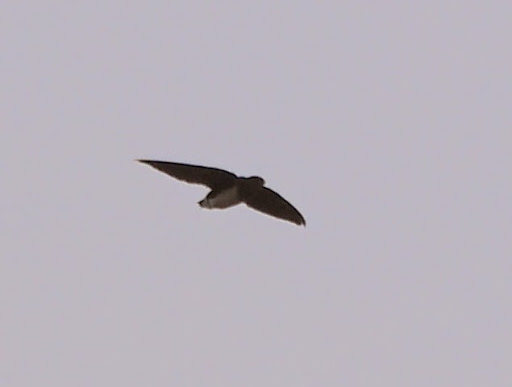

Conservation status
- Least Concern (IUCN 3.1)

Scientific classification
- Kingdom: Animalia
- Phylum: Chordata
- Class: Aves
- Clade: Strisores
- Order: Apodiformes
- Family: Apodidae
- Genus: Neafrapus
- Species: N. cassini

Binomial name
- Neafrapus cassini (Sclater, PL, 1863)

= Cassin's spinetail =

Species of bird

Cassin's spinetail (Neafrapus cassini) is a species of swift in the family Apodidae. It is found throughout the African tropical rainforest (including Bioko).
