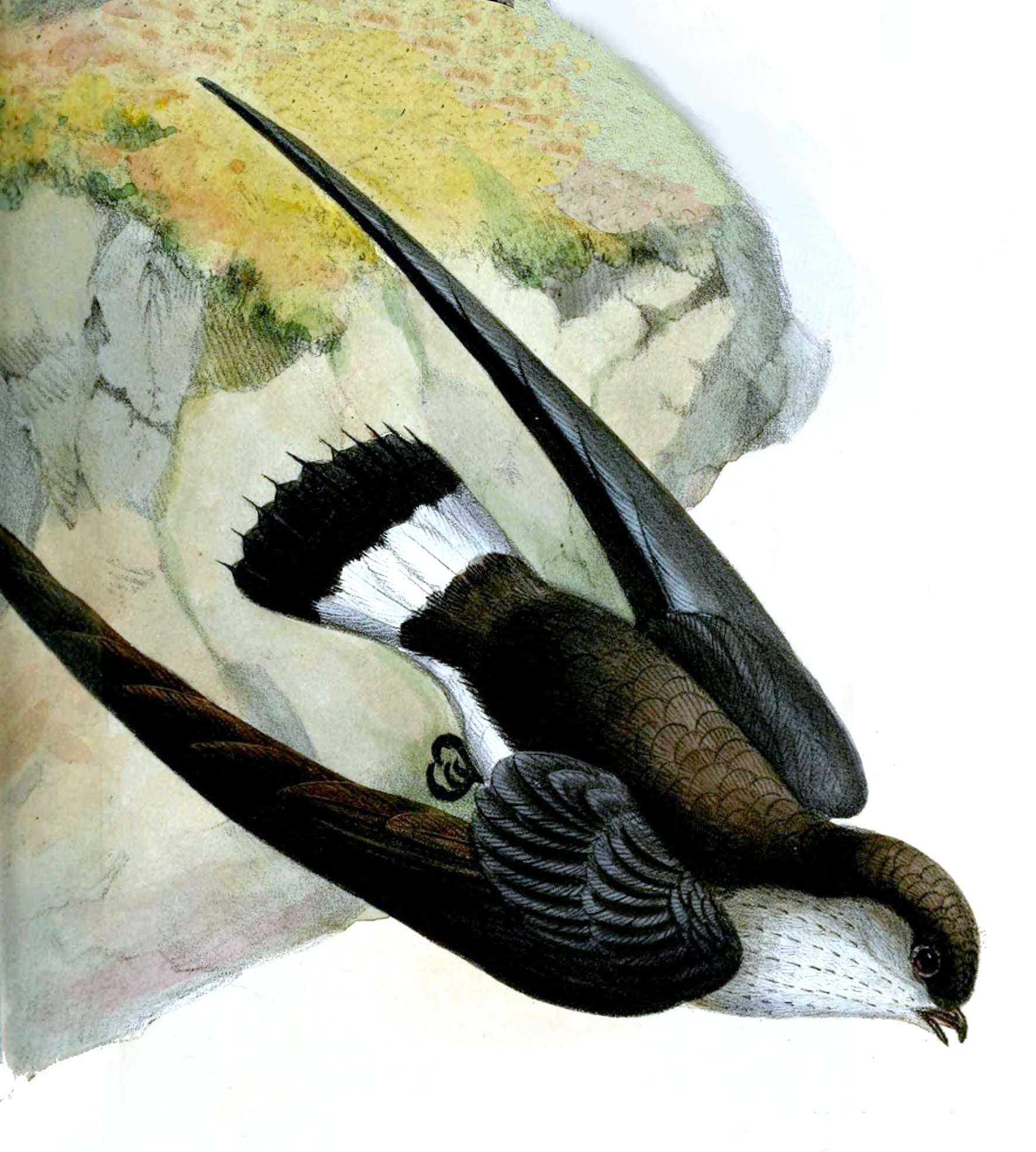
- Cassin's spinetail (Neafrapus cassini)

Scientific classification
- Kingdom: Animalia
- Phylum: Chordata
- Class: Aves
- Order: Apodiformes
- Family: Apodidae
- Tribe: Chaeturini
- Genus: Neafrapus; Mathews, 1918

Type species
- Chaetura cassini Sclater, 1863

= Neafrapus =

Genus of birds

Neafrapus is a genus of swift in the family Apodidae.

It contains the following species:

- Böhm's spinetail (Neafrapus boehmi)
- Cassin's spinetail (Neafrapus cassini)
