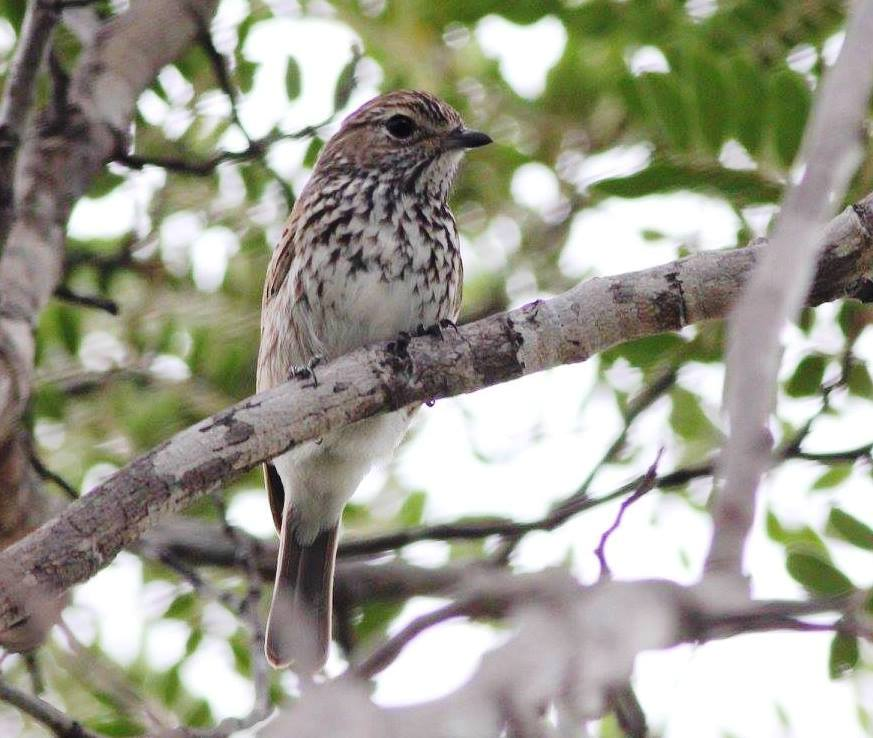

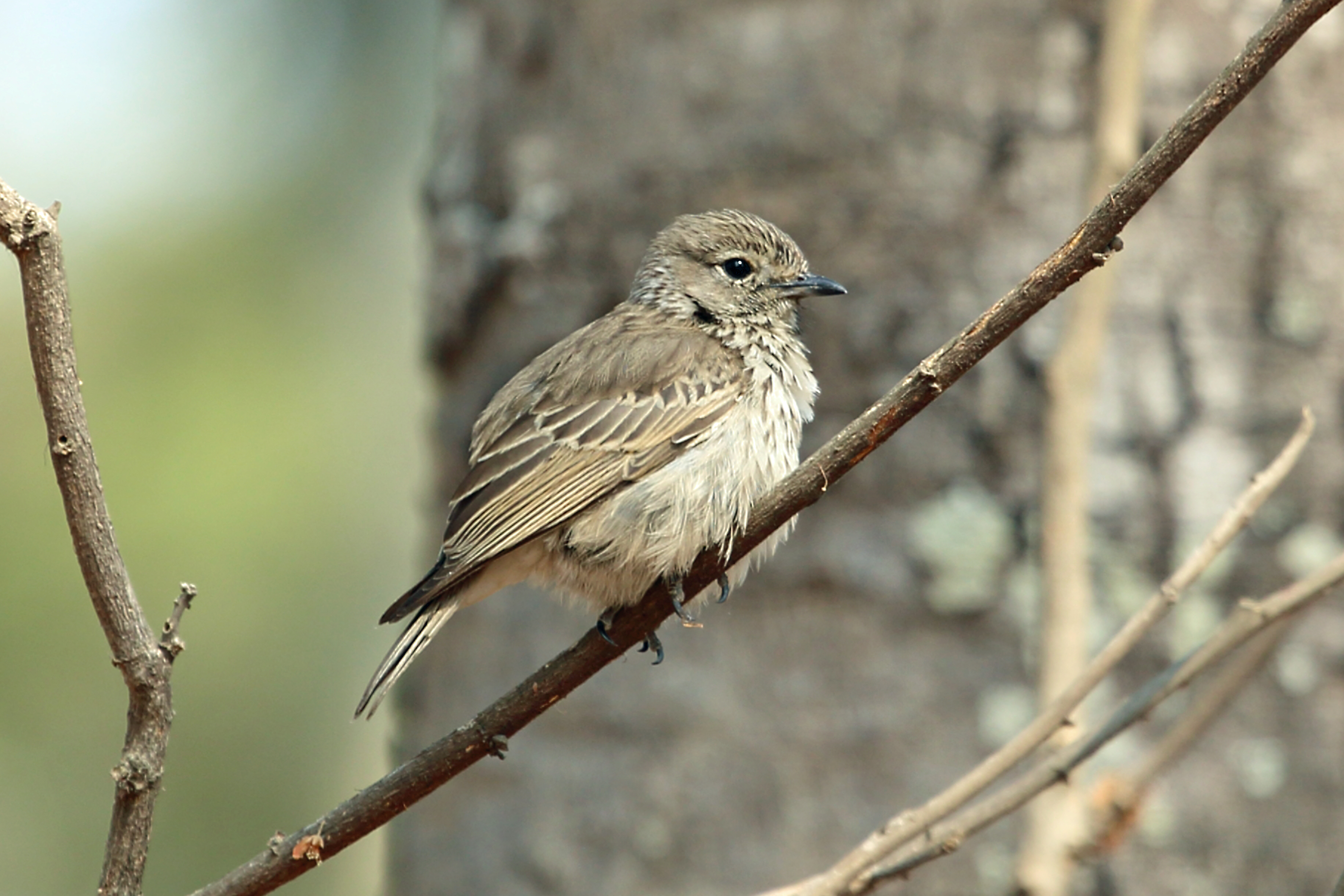

Conservation status
- Least Concern (IUCN 3.1)

Scientific classification
- Kingdom: Animalia
- Phylum: Chordata
- Class: Aves
- Order: Passeriformes
- Family: Muscicapidae
- Genus: Myopornis
- Species: M. boehmi

Binomial name
- Myopornis boehmi (Reichenow, 1884)

Synonyms
- Muscicapa boehmi Bradornis boehmi

= Böhm's flycatcher =

Species of bird

Böhm's flycatcher (Myopornis boehmi) is a species of passerine bird in the Old world flycatcher family Muscicapidae. It is the only species placed in the genus Myopornis. It is found in Sub-Saharan Africa from Angola to Tanzania, Malawi and south Zambia. Its natural habitat is subtropical or tropical dry forests (namely the miombo woodlands). It is named after German zoologist Richard Böhm.

== Taxonomy ==
Böhm's flycatcher was formally described in 1884 by the German ornithologist Anton Reichenow based on a specimen that had been collected by the naturalist Richard Böhm at Kakoma, in Tanzania. Reichenow coined the binomial name Bradyornis boehmi where the specific epithet was chosen to honour the collector. Böhm's flycatcher is now the only species placed in the genus Myopornis that was introduced by Reichenow in 1901. The genus name combines the Ancient Greek μυωψ/muōps, μυωπος/muōpos means "horsefly" with ορνις/ornis, ορνιθος/ornithos meaning "bird".
