= Muganja hills =

- Monts Mugandja
- Location within Democratic Republic of the Congo

Highest point
- Elevation: 2,000 m (6,600 ft)
- Coordinates: 6°41′16″S 29°21′45″E

Geography
- Country: Democratic Republic of the Congo
- Province: Katanga
- Range coordinates: 6°37′31″S 29°23′29″E

The Muganja hills (French: Monts Mugandja) are a range in the Tanganyika District of Katanga Province in the Democratic Republic of the Congo, to the south of Kalemie.

The Kyimbi River originates in the Muganja plateau at a height of 6,560 feet (2,000 m). It has a series of falls over a distance of 2 miles (3.2 km), with the largest 300 to 500 feet (91 to 152 m) high. The total drop is over 2,500 feet (760 m). The Muganja massif contains the Lukuga coalfield near Kalemie.

The Muganja hills lie to the north of the Marungu massif, which as of 2008 had almost all been converted to farmland or pasture. However, the Muganja hills in 2008 were surrounded by a large area of Miombo woodland and riverine forest. A survey that year found evidence of chimpanzee, baboon, blue monkey and bushpig in the forest to the north of the hills. About 59 chimpanzees were estimated to be present.
