= Jérôme Becker =

Belgian explorer and artillery officer (1850–1912)

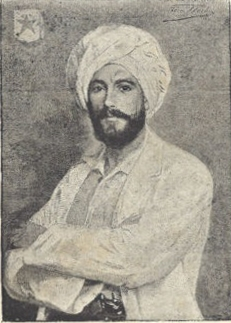
- Illustration of Becker from 1883
- Born: 21 August 1850; Kalmthout, Belgium
- Died: 30 March 1912 (aged 61); Antwerp, Belgium
- Burial place: Kiel, Antwerp

Captain Jérôme Becker (21 August 1850 – 30 March 1912) was a Belgian explorer and artillery officer who led several expeditions into Central Africa on behalf of the International African Association (AIA) and the Congo Free State, participating in some of the AIA's earliest explorations of Central Africa.

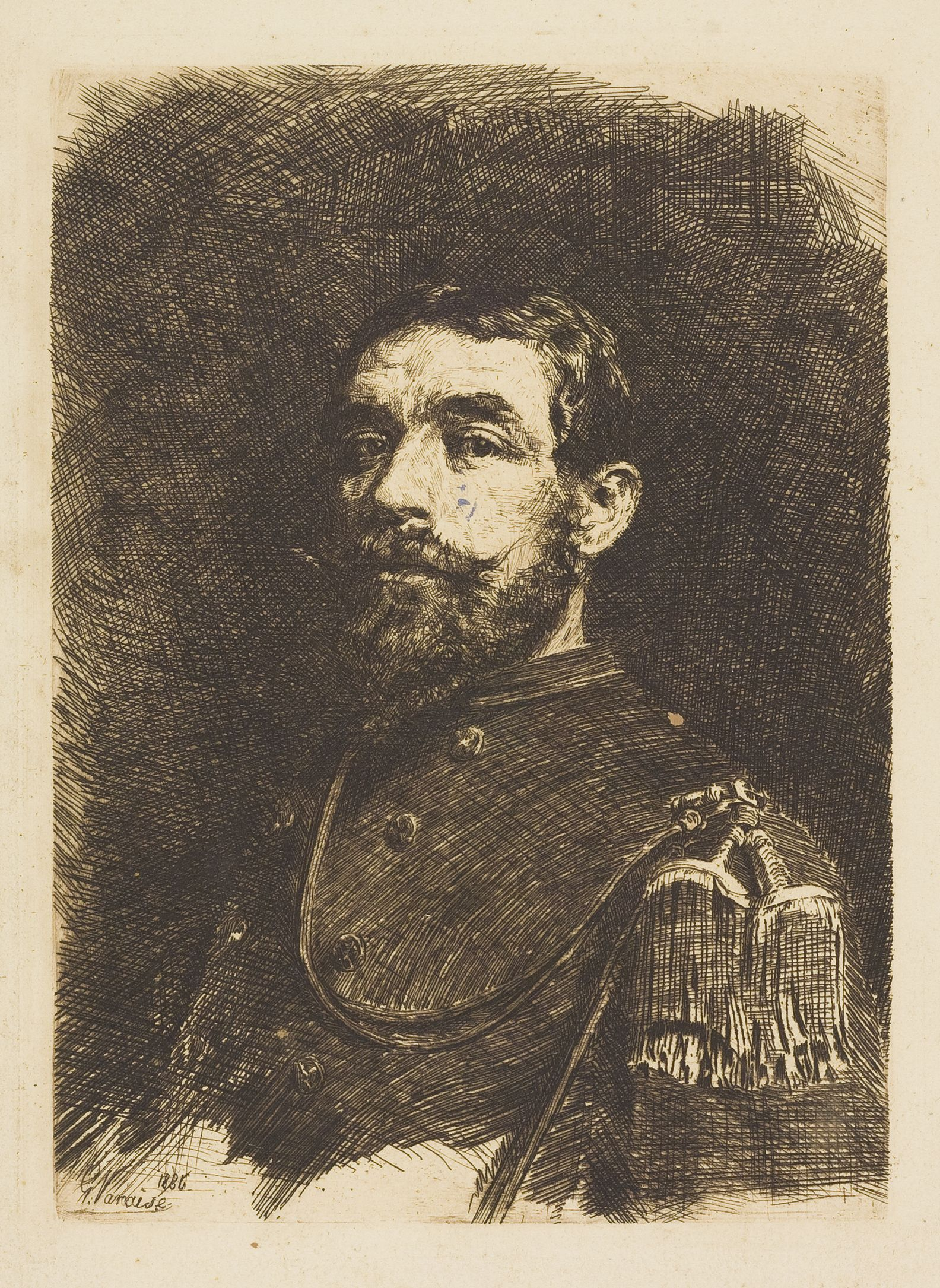
Becker in military dress

He was born at Kalmthout on 21 August 1850, the son of Guillaume-Joseph Becker and Anne-Marie Anthonissen, and joined the 5th Artillery Regiment before being seconded to the Military Cartography Institute. In this capacity, he was first sent to Central Africa under Jules Ramaeckers in 1880, travelling to Karema, where he participated in the development and "beautification" of the town, and befriended both Mirambo and Tippu Tib. When Ramaeckers died on 25 February 1882, Becker was interim governor pending the arrival of Ramaeckers' official successor, Émile Storms. After Storms' arrival, villagers under Karema's Chief, Yassagula, attacked the Belgian fort, prompting Becker to lead a counterattack with his askaris and destroy the village.

In 1884, Becker was ordered to lead an expedition to Lake Tanganyika, to link a series of captured bomas with forts he would build further inland. Although Becker intended to push as far inland as Nyangwe, on the Lualaba River, logistical problems and his own illness prevented the expedition from leaving Zanzibar until 15 May 1885, when Becker ceded command to Adolphe Durutte. He returned to the Congo as a District Commissioner in 1885. Due to his pro-Zanzibari Arab sympathies, in 1889, he was sent to the Stanley Falls District of the Congo Free State to try and re-establish good relations with Tippu Tib and his Arabs, who held de facto power in the region and had been made a salaried employee of the Free State two years previously. Although he failed to make any lasting contracts with Tippu Tib, he did acquire much ivory from him, and taught his son Sefu bin Hamid to write Swahili in Latin script. Becker's sympathies led him to take the part of the Arabs, resulting in his fall from official favour and his resignation. He subsequently spent time staying with the Arabs, exploring the region with their trading parties, before returning to Europe in 1890 or 1891, shortly before the outbreak of the Congo Arab War.

In Belgium, he was accused of cruelty towards Africans and of attempting to murder Jules Ramaeckers, but was acquitted unanimously, the latter charge being proven false by a letter sent by Ramaeckers shortly after the alleged attempted murder. He retired shortly afterwards, and spent time in Madagascar and Saint-Domingue before being appointed Inspector of Explosives at Lillo in 1902. He died in Antwerp on 30 March 1912 of a stroke caused by a fall.

Becker believed that the Arab slave trade was an "excellent institution," and that Africans were happier as slaves than they were as free men, describing Tippu Tib's slaves as "happy, faithful and devoted".

== Honours ==
- Congo Free State: Service Star
- Ottoman Empire: Order of the Medjidie

== Bibliography ==
- La troisième expédition Belge au pays noir (1883), Bruxelles: J. Lebècue
- La vie and Afrique, ou; Trois ans dans l'Afrique central (1887), Paris: J. Lebègue
