= Richard Böhm =

German zoologist and explorer (1854–1884)

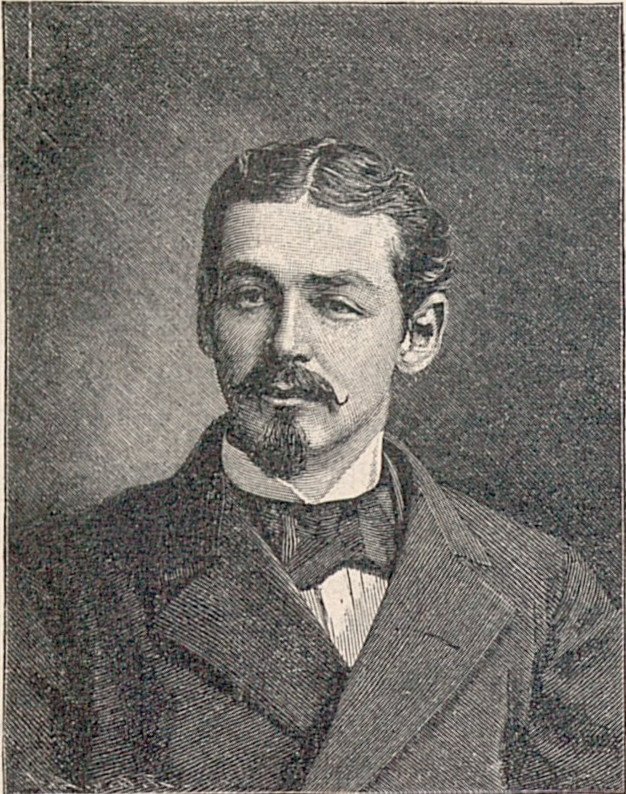
- Born: 1 October 1854; Berlin, Kingdom of Prussia
- Died: 27 March 1884 (aged 29); Katapana, Katanga
- Occupation(s): Zoologist, explorer
- Years active: 1877–1884
- Known for: Ornithology

Richard Böhm (1 October 1854 − 27 March 1884) was a German zoologist and explorer.

== Life ==
Böhm was born on 1 October 1854, in Berlin, to Ludwig—a physician—and Franziska Louise Böhm (née Meyerlinck). As a child, he received a copy of Brehms Tierleben for Christmas, which "became a source of unimagined pleasure" for the young Böhm. He studied zoology at the Friedrich Schiller University in Jena with the Darwinist Ernst Haeckel and attained a doctorate in 1877. His dissertation was on Helgoland leptomeduses. In April 1880, he and Paul Reichard went on an expedition to Zanzibar and then, in East Africa, the east bank of Lake Tanganyika and the southeast of Lake Upemba, which he discovered. His correspondence appeared in 1888 under the title Ostafrika, Sansibar und Tanganjika heraus: Von Sansibar zum Tanganjika, Briefe aus Ostafrika von Dr. Richard Böhm (J. A. Brockhaus, Leipzig 1888 Ed. Herman Schalow). Böhm wrote numerous articles in the Journal of Ornithology from 1882 to 1887. He was one of the first zoologists to research the animals between the East-African steppe and West-African forest and discovered numerous new species of birds. He died on 27 March 1884, aged 29, in Katapana, from malaria.

=== Species Named After Böhm ===
Anton Reichenow and Herman Schalow dedicated bird species to him.

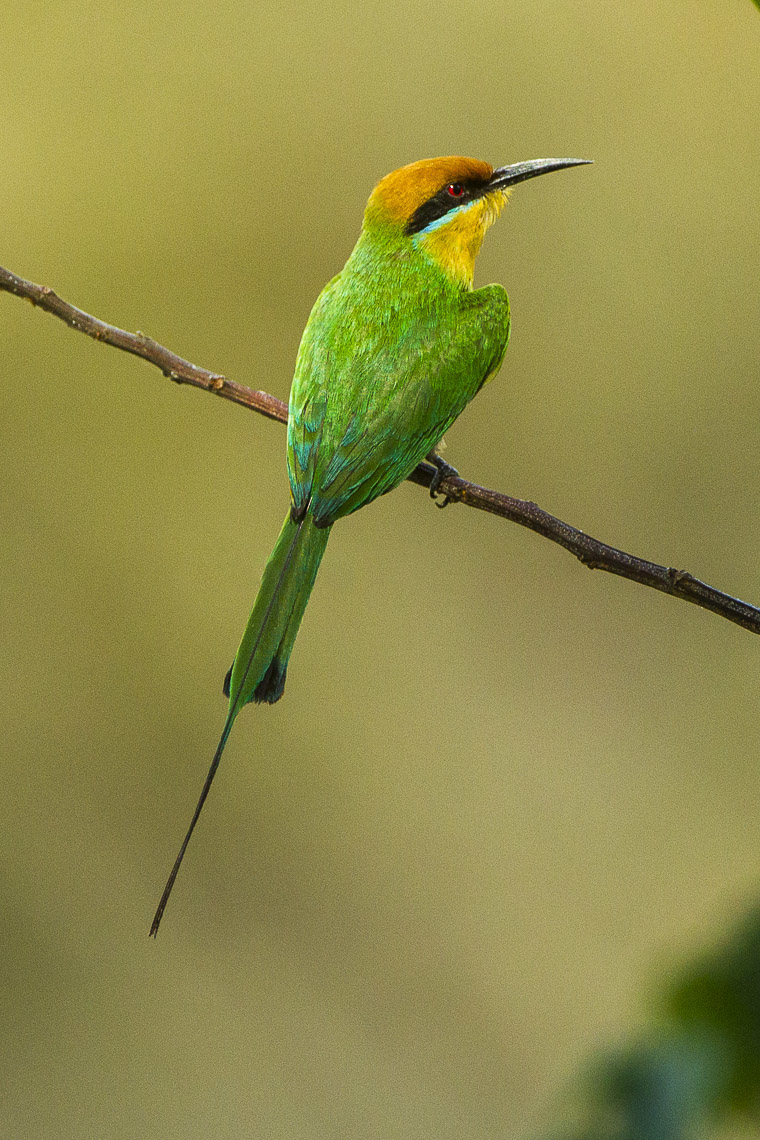
Merops boehmi (Boehm's Bee-eater)

- Merops boehmi (Reichenow 1882)
- Sarothrura boehmi (Reichenow 1900)
- Neafrapus boehmi (Schalow 1882)
- Muscicapa boehmi (Reichenow 1884).
