= Katanga Plateau =

Coordinates: 11.55°S 26.75°E

The Katanga or Shaba plateau is a farming and ranching region in the Democratic Republic of the Congo. Located in the southeastern Katanga Province, it is bordered by the Kundelungu and Mitumba mountain ranges to the north, Muchinga mountain range to the east, and is connected to the Lunda Plateau in the south and west. it is 1,220 m (4,000 ft) above sea level and is rich in copper and uranium deposits. The altitude makes it cooler than the surrounding area, with a mean annual temperature of 19–20 °C. The existence of seasonal rainfall makes the Katanga Plateau a fertile arable area as well as an industrial region in the DR Congo.

It is the source of the Lufira River, which becomes the Lualaba River. Lake Tshangalele is an artificial lake created by a dam on the Lufira River and is an important ecological site on the plateau.
