= Mulobozi River =

River in Democratic Republic of the Congo

Coordinates: 7.016096°S 29.757521°E

Location
- Country: Democratic Republic of the Congo
- Province: Tanganyika Province

Physical characteristics
- Mouth
  - location: Lake Tanganyika

The Mulobozi River is a stream in Tanganyika Province (formerly Katanga Province) of the southeastern Democratic Republic of the Congo.

It flows from the west, through the Marungu highlands, into Lake Tanganyika just to the north of Moba port. The riparian forest patches along its course are in great danger of destruction from logging and from stream bank erosion by cattle. The mollusk Tomichia guillemei inhabits Mulobozi and lives on muddy river deltas in Lake Tanganyika.
