= Lubanda =

Coordinates: 9.363°S 33.465°E

Lubanda is an administrative ward in Ileje District, Songwe Region, Tanzania. According to the 2002 census, the ward has a total population of 7,952.
