= Herman Schalow =

German ornithologist (1852–1925)

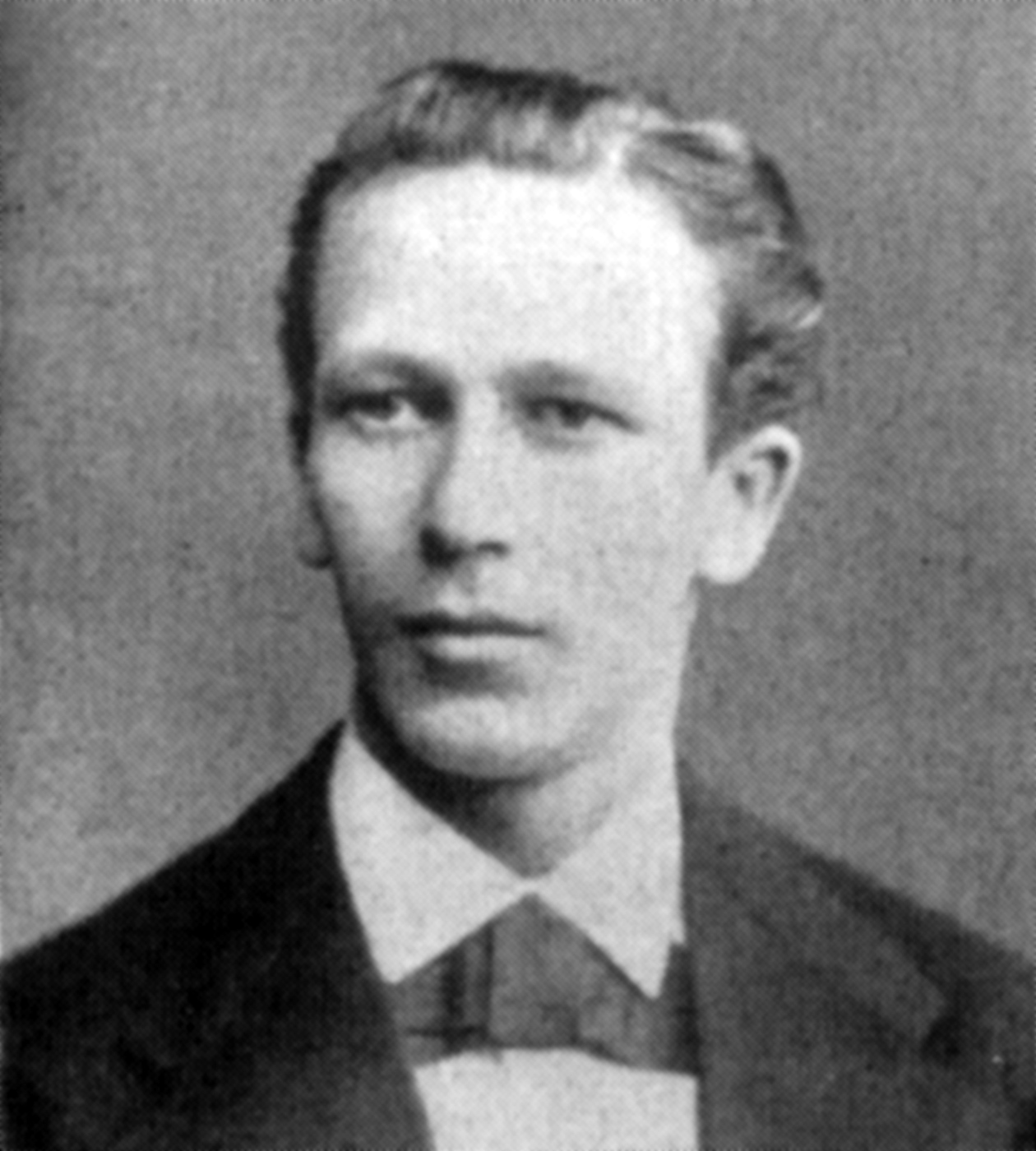
- Born: 17 January 1852; Berlin, Germany
- Died: 9 December 1925 (aged 73)
- Occupations: Ornithologist and Banker
- Known for: Ornithology

Herman Schalow (17 January 1852 – 9 December 1925), also incorrectly written Hermann Schalow, was a German ornithologist.

Herman Schalow was a banker; He studied ornithology as an amateur with Jean Louis Cabanis (1816–1906) and worked with Anton Reichenow (1847–1941). Between 1894 and 1907, he was vice president and 1907–1921 President of the German Ornithological Society.

Schalow was the author of Die Musophagidae (1886), Die Vögel der Arktis, Birds of the Arctic (1905) and many scientific papers on birds. He also edited the travelogue written by Richard Böhm (1854–1884) Ostafrika, Sansibar und Tanganjika heraus: Von Sansibar zum Tanganjika, Briefe aus Ostafrika von Dr. Richard Böhm (J. A. Brockhaus, Leipzig 1888).

Schalow described 270 species. The Berlin Museum of Natural History honoured him by naming a library after him, and Anton Reichenow named Schalow's turaco for him.
