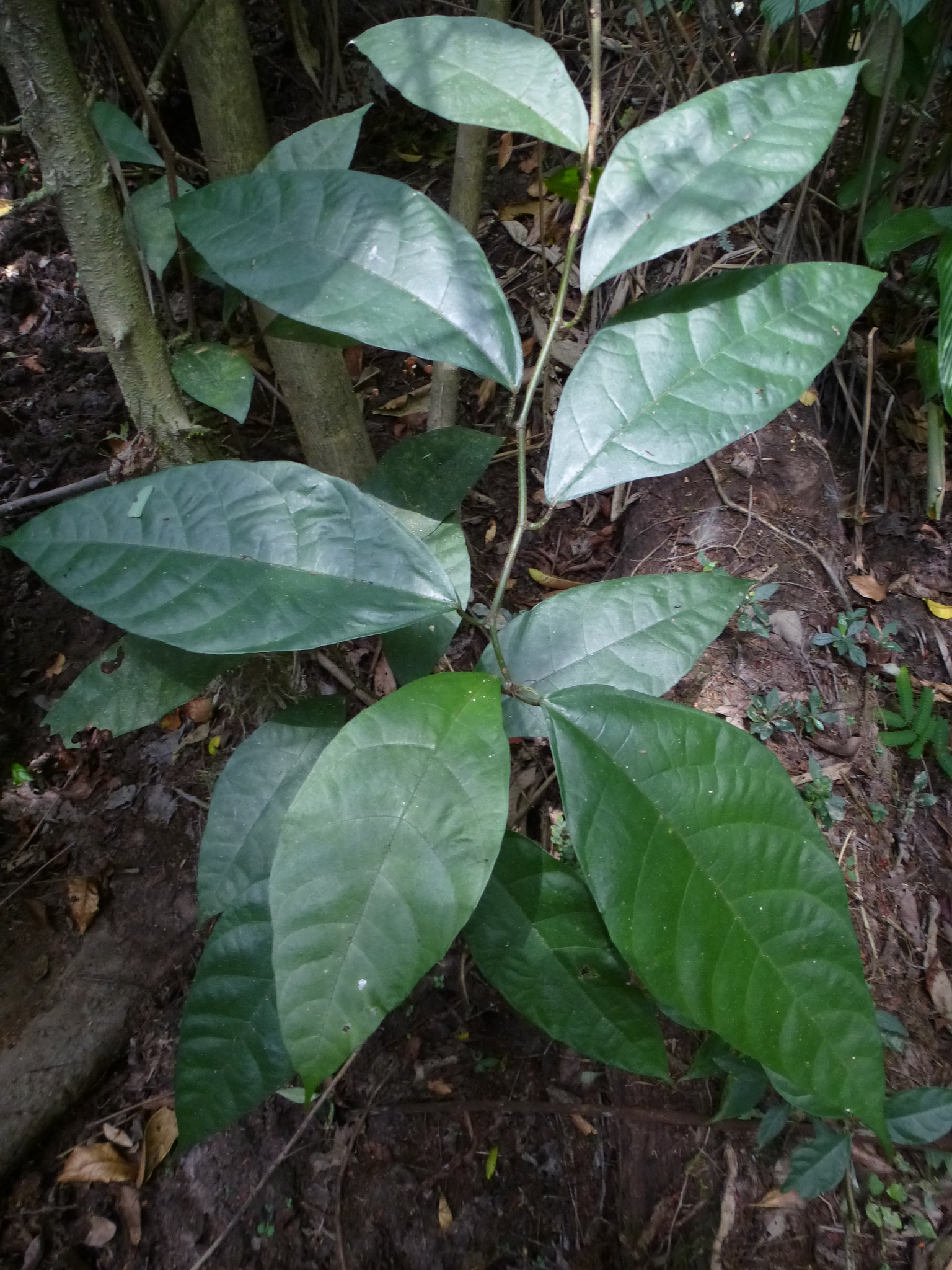

Conservation status
- Least Concern (IUCN 3.1)

Scientific classification
- Kingdom: Plantae
- Clade: Tracheophytes
- Clade: Angiosperms
- Clade: Eudicots
- Clade: Rosids
- Order: Rosales
- Family: Moraceae
- Genus: Ficus
- Species: F. asperifolia

Binomial name
- Ficus asperifolia Miq.

Synonyms
- List: Ficus acutifolia Hutch.; Ficus cnestrophylla Warb.; Ficus colpophylla Warb.; Ficus irumuensis De Wild.; Ficus manicariarum Standl.; Ficus paludicola Warb.; Ficus pendula Welw. ex Hiern; Ficus scolopophora Warb.; Ficus storthophylla Warb.; Ficus storthophylla var. cuneata De Wild.; Ficus urceolaris Welw. ex Hiern; Ficus urceolaris var. bumbana Hiern; Ficus warburgii H.J.P.Winkl.; Ficus xiphophora Warb.

= Ficus asperifolia =

Species of plant

Ficus asperifolia is a species of scrambling shrub or small sized gynodioecious fig tree belonging to the family Moraceae. It grows up to 6 m high and often has climbing branches.

== Description ==
Leaves of the species are elliptical to obovate in shape, up to 20 cm long and 8 cm wide, apex is long and acuminate while base is cuneate to obtusely rounded. Leaves commonly have stipules; petiole is up to 1 cm long and margin tends to be lobed or dentate. Peduncles, 2–15 mm long, the figs are orange to purplish red, up to 2 cm in diameter and globular in shape; figs are sometimes paired or single on leaf axils.

== Distribution and habitat ==
Ficus asperifolia occurs in Senegal westwards to Sudan and Kenya and southwards to Zambia. It is found in savannas and edges of gallery forests.

== Uses ==
In Cameroon dried fruit of the species are used in traditional medine to treate infertility, extracts of the species are also used to aid the wound healing process.
