= Paul Reichard =

German explorer (1854–1938)

Paul Reichard (2 December 1854 – 16 September 1938) was a German explorer who traveled extensively in the African continent. His discoveries led to the establishment of the German East Africa Protectorate.

== Early years ==
Paul Reichard was born on 2 December 1854 in Neuwied on the Rhine. He studied in Munich, and in 1873, joined the Corps Rheno-Palatia, a student organization. After graduation, he was employed for some time as an engineer in Kaiserslautern. In 1880 he volunteered as a member of an expedition of the German African society to establish a scientific station in East Africa. He prepared and equipped himself, taking Swahili lessons, and contributed 50,000 marks of his own money toward the cost of the expedition.

== African exploration ==
At first the leader of the expedition was Captain von Schoeler, and other members were the zoologist Richard Boehm and the topographer Edward Kaiser. In July 1880 they marched into the interior of what is now Tanzania from the port of Bagamoyo. In November, they founded the Kakoma station in Unjamwesi, and stayed there for nine months. Captain von Scholer returned to Europe via Zanzibar after founding the station at Kakama. In 1881 Boehm and Reichard explored the Wala River, to the west of Gondo, as far as its mouth. Boehm and Kaiser made a three-month expedition to Lake Tanganyika, returning to the Gondo station at the end of 1881.

Later a station was established at Igonda. Reichard said of the Ufipa of the Rukwa region to the east of Lake Tanganyika that "calm, peace and order" reigned within the Fipa state. He described the rule of King Kapuufi as "generally energetic, but nevertheless mild". In October 1882 Eduard Kaiser died on an expedition to Lake Rukwa. In December 1882, Reichard and Böhm left Igonda and traveled to Lake Tanganyika, exploring Karema in Tanzania and Mpala to the west of the lake in the Congo Free State.

Boehm and Reichard left the Belgian station of Mpala on the Tanganyika on 1 September 1883. They managed to cross the Luapala into a country then called "Urua". Reichard crossed the Luapula twice, finding it was only 200 yards (180 m) wide, with many waterfalls and rapids as it drops down through the Konde Irunde and Mitumba mountains. Boehm died on 27 March 1884. Reichard observed that the Lualaba River was between 1,200 yards (1,100 m) and 600 yards (550 m) wide and appeared to be the true source of the Congo based on volume of water. He found that the Lualaba flows through Lake Upemba and then through Kikonja Lake further to the north. Reichard travelled up the Lufira River to the copper mines of Katanga, of which the Europeans were already aware. He reported that the Katanga region was subject to the powerful chief Msiri. The discoveries forced a number of revisions of the map of central Africa. He struggled back to the east, reaching Zanzibar on the Indian Ocean coast in November 1884.

== Later career ==
In 1889 Reichard criticized the German government for making the mistake of treating the Sultan Seyid Bargash of Zanzibar in the same way as a European monarch. He said that when the German fleet visited it should have simply occupied the sultanate. Reichard and Böhm had made significant land acquisitions in the territories they explored, and Reichard called for a German protectorate, which came into formal existence with the signature of an agreement between Germany and Britain on 1 July 1890.

He wrote numerous reports on the expedition that appeared in the Communications of the German African society. In 1888 Reichard published observations on African slavery, saying that the trade is mainly conducted by Africans rather than Arabs. He said that 80% to 98% of Africans were slaves, with only the chiefs and their relatives being free. The owner had to treat his slaves well or they would simply run away to become a slave elsewhere. A comment on these assertions in the Journal of the American Geographical and Statistical Society said "Mr. Reichard's reasoning shows he has kept his nature unspotted from the world, and is more guileless than any one but a slave owner or a chief".

In 1889 Reichard published an exhaustive account of African ivory and the ivory trade. The accompanying map showed the range of elephants extending throughout sub-Saharan Africa, but showed that already in most regions they had been driven back from the coastal lands. He distinguished between the more valuable soft ivory from elephants that live in open woodlands and short-grass savannahs, and the less valuable hard ivory from elephants of the jungles and long-grassed savannahs. The trade at that time was dominated by Arabs based on Zanzibar in the east and by Portuguese in Angola in the west.

After his return to Europe, Reichard lived in Nice for a while, then moved to Berlin-Charlottenburg, where he died on 16 September 1938 and was buried in the Stahnsdorf South-Western Cemetery.

== Publications ==
- "Bericht über eine Reise nach Urua und Katanga (Report on a trip to Urua and Katanga)". Globus. Zeitschrift für Länder- und Völkerkunde (in German). 48: 23–26. 1885.
- "Die Wanjanuesi (The Wanjanuesi)". Zeitschrift für Erdkunde (in German). 24: 246–331. 1889.
- "Das afrikanische Elfenbein und sein Handel (African ivory, and its trade)". Deutsche Geographische Blätter (in German). 12: 132ff. 1889.
- "Was soll mit den befreiten Sklaven geschehen (What should happen with freed slaves)". Deutsche Kolonialzeitung (in German). 6: 281ff. 1889.
- Vorschläge zu einer praktischen Reiseausrüstung für Ost- und Centralafrika (Proposals for practical travel gear for East and Central Africa) (in German). Berlin. 1889.
- Dr. Emin Pascha. Ein Vorkämpfer der Kultur im Innern Afrikas (Dr. Emin Pasha. A champion of culture in the African interior) (in German). Leipzig. 1891.
- Deutsch-Ostafrika. Das Land und seine Bewohner. Seine politische und wirtschaftliche Entwicklung (German East Africa. The land and its inhabitants. Its political and economic development) (in German). Leipzig. 1892.
- Stanley (in German). Berlin. 1897.

== External sources ==
- "African Slavery and the Arabs". Journal of the American Geographical and Statistical Society. Vol. 21. John H. Schultz & Co. 1889.
- Bückendorf, Jutta (1997). "Schwarz-Weiß-RoT" über Ostafrka. Deutsche Kolonialpläne und afrikanische Realität. Münster. pp. 143–144.
- Cohen, Ronald; Toland, Judith Drick (1988). State formation and political legitimacy. Transaction Publishers. ISBN 0-88738-161-8.
- Collet, C. D. (1889). Diplomatic fly-sheets. Vol. 5. Office of the Diplomatic reviews.
- "Copper-mines of Katanga". Proceedings of the Royal Geographical Society and monthly record of geography. Vol. 7. Edward Stanford. 1885.
- Fabian, Johannes (2000). Out of our minds: reason and madness in the exploration of Central Africa. University of California Press. p. 21. ISBN 0-520-22123-0.
- Karsch, F. (1886). "Über eine neue von dem Afrikareisenden Herrn Paul Reichard in Ostafrika entdeckte Harlekin-Krabbenspinne". Berliner Entomologische Zeitschrift. 30: 95–96. doi:10.1002/mmnd.18860300114.
- Reichshandbuch der Deutschen Gesellschaft. Vol. 2. Berlin. 1931. p. 398.
- Kullnik, Heinz (1960). Berliner und Wahlberlner. Berlin. p. 429.
- Lockyer, Sir Norman (1883). "Geographical Notes". Nature: international journal of science. Vol. 27. Macmillan Journals ltd.
- Schnee, Heinrich (1920). Deutsches Kolonial-Lexikon. Vol. III. Leipzig. p. 146.
- White, Arthur Silva (1890). The development of Africa. G. Philip & Son. p. 239.
- Archive Paul Reichard, Royal Museum for Central Africa
