= Family tree of the Busaid dynasty =

The House of Busaid, also known as the House of Al Said, are the current rulers of Oman and the former rulers of Zanzibar.

House of Busaid

Oman (1744-present)
Zanzibar (1856-1964)

Ahmad bin Said^{(1)} r. 1744-1783
Said bin Ahmad^{(2)} r. 1783-1786	Sultan bin Ahmad^{(4)} r. 1792-1804	Qais bin Ahmad
Hamad bin Said^{(3)} r. 1786-1792	Said bin Sultan^{(5)} r. 1804-1856	Azzan bin Qais
Majid bin Said^{(1)} r. 1856-1870	Barghash bin Said^{(2)} r. 1870-1888	Khalifah bin Said^{(3)} r. 1888-1890	Ali bin Said^{(4)} r. 1890-1893	Mohammed bin Said	Thuwaini bin Said^{(6)} r. 1856-1866	Turki bin Said^{(9)} r. 1871-1888	Qais bin Azzan
Khalid bin Barghash^{(6)} r. 1896	Hamud bin Mohammed^{(7)} r. 1896-1902	Harub bin Thuwaini	Salim bin Thuwaini^{(7)} r. 1866-1868	Hamad bin Thuwaini^{(5)} r. 1893-1896	Turkia bint Turki	Faisal bin Turki^{(10)} r. 1888-1913	Azzan bin Qais^{(8)} r. 1868-1871
Ali bin Hamud^{(8)} r. 1902-1911	Matuka bint Hamud	Khalifa bin Harub^{(9)} r. 1911-1960	Taimur bin Faisal^{(11)} r. 1913-1932
Tohfa bint Ali	Abdullah bin Khalifa^{(10)} r. 1960-1963	Said bin Taimur^{(12)} r. 1932-1970	Tariq bin Taimur
Jamshid bin Abdullah^{(11)} r. 1963-1964	Qaboos bin Said^{(13)} r. 1970-2020	Haitham bin Tariq^{(14)} r. 2020-present
