= Albrecht von Rechenberg =

German jurist, diplomat and politician

Freiherr Albrecht von Rechenberg
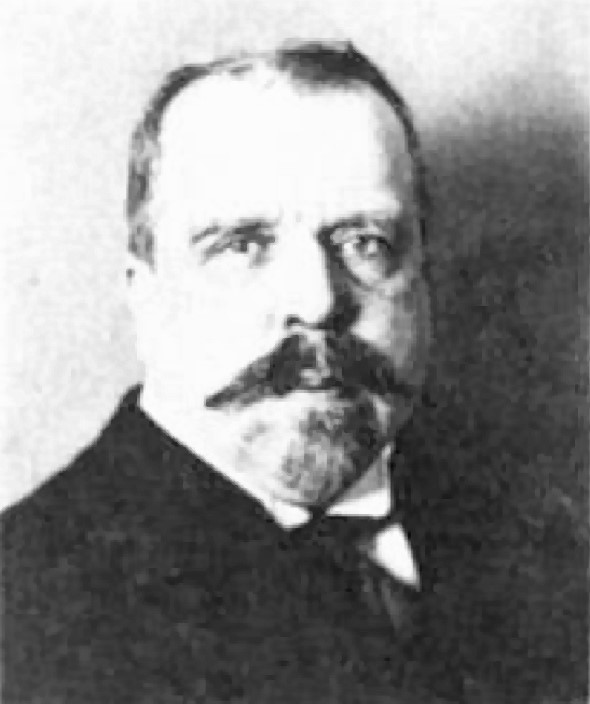
- Albrecht Freiherr von Rechenberg (1861-1935)

Governor of German East Africa
- In office 15 April 1906 – 22 April 1912
- Preceded by: Gustav Adolf Graf von Götzen
- Succeeded by: Heinrich Schnee

Personal details
- Born: 15 December 1861 Madrid, Spain
- Died: 26 February 1935 (aged 73) Berlin, Prussia, Nazi Germany
- Party: Zentrum
- Spouse: Gabriele Mittenzweig
- Profession: jurist, diplomat, public servant, politician

Albrecht von Rechenberg, Albrecht Freiherr von Rechenberg or Georg Albrecht Julius Heinrich Friedrich Carl Ferdinand Maria Freiherr von Rechenberg (born 15 September 1861, Madrid. Died 26 February 1935, Berlin) was a German jurist, diplomat and politician who served as Governor of German East Africa and as a member of the Imperial Diet (German: Reichstag).

== Family ==
Albrecht von Rechenberg was born in Madrid, Spain. As the son of a Prussian aristocrat by birth, his Roman Catholic family traced its origins back to Meissen in mediaeval times, with the title Baron (German: Freiherr) conferred in the 16th, and confirmed by a coat of arms in the 17th century. His father, Julius von Rechenberg (1812-1892), whose own father was later a Royal Prussian Privy Councillor, hailed from a long tradition in diplomatic service. His mother, Helene Fiedler (1841–1911), came from a family of bankers. He married Gabriele Mittenzweig (1875–1965), daughter of a medical director (German: Medizinalrat), in Marienbad, in 1914, but in their marriage, they bore no child. Unlike his predecessors, he left no memoirs and there is no biography of his life.

== Early life and career ==
He attended school in Prague, where his father had been posted as Consul General, and studied law in Prague, Berlin and Leipzig, but also spent much of his youth in the Russian Empire. He was made a court assessor in 1889, and entered the Foreign Office in the same year. In 1893, he served as a district judge in Tanga, in the newly established colonial possession of German East Africa.

== British protectorate of Zanzibar ==
Following the Heligoland–Zanzibar Treaty signed in July 1890, Zanzibar became a British Protectorate, while Germany retained dominion over German East Africa. In 1896, he was appointed German Vice Consul, and later Consul, to Zanzibar.

His spell in Zanzibar was not without international repercussions when the death of the pro-British Sultan Hamad bin Thuwaini, Sultan of Zanzibar, on 25 August 1896, led to the seizure of power by Khalid bin Barghash, the second son of the 2nd Sultan of Zanzibar, Barghash bin Said. Khalid, a young man at the time, was disapproved of by the British authorities, who favoured the succession of the more pliable Hamud bin Muhammed. The immediate result of this was the declaration of war, the so-called Anglo-Zanzibar War, which lasted only a few minutes. After the bombardment of the town and palace, Khalid was forced to seek refuge in the German consulate. Basil Cave, the British representative there, informed the Foreign Secretary, Marquess of Salisbury, in September, that he "remains in the house all the doors of which are guarded, from the inside, by about ten armed sailors or marines from a German man-of-war in harbour. The Consulate is being carefully and constantly watched by men in the service of Sir Lloyd Mathews". In October 1896, Rechenberg wrote to Cave saying, "Monsieur le Gerant, J'ai l'honneur de vous informer que mon Gouvemement m'a ordonne d'envoyer Chalid bin Bargash á Dar-es-Salaam. Le transport sera effectue sans que Chalid touche le sol de Zanzibar". ('To the Principal Officer: I beg to inform you that my Government has requested me to send Chalid bin Bargash to Dar es Salaam. The transportation will be carried out without Chalid setting foot on the soil of Zanzibar'). Events transpired as Rechenberg had outlined, and Khalid was conveyed by a ship anchored outside the Imperial Consulate safely to Dar es Salaam without Khalid stepping on Zanzibari soil.

Rechenberg, who had previously studied at the oriental Seminar of the Friedrich Wilhelm Universität, founded in 1879, (now the Humboldt University of Berlin), with his time in Tanga and Zanzibar, became fluent in his command of other languages, adding a proficiency in Arabic, Gujarati and Kiswahili.

== Europe ==
After 4 years as Consul in Zanzibar, he held posts in Moscow, in 1900, as Consul there, and as General Consul in Warsaw, in 1905–06, succeeding his father. Much of Poland, including Warsaw, was part of the Russian Empire as Russian Poland, and his period in office coincided with the Russian Revolution of 1905.

== German East Africa ==
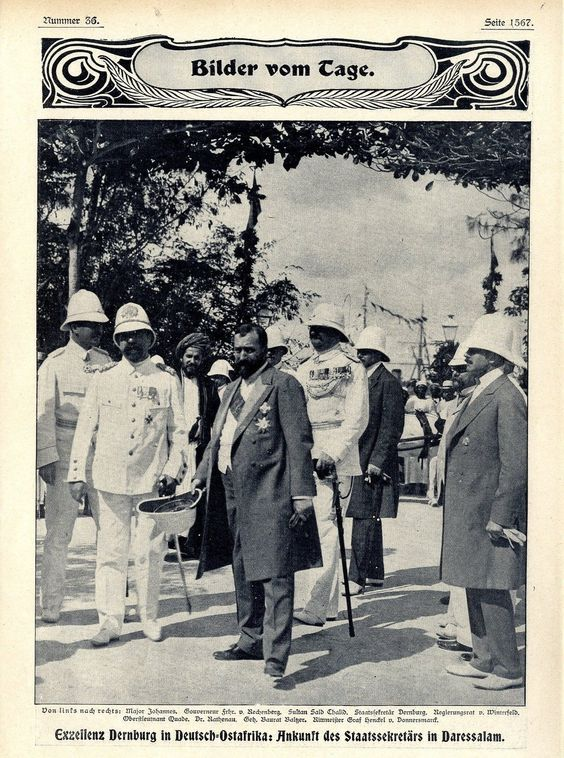
Governor Rechenberg, Dernberg, Sultan Khalid and others in Dar es Salaam in 1907

From 1905 to 1907, the territory of German East Africa had been shaken by the Maji Maji Rebellion, a series of armed uprisings of different tribes and other sections of the population. It was eventually suppressed by the ruthless use of the military under the governor Gustav Adolf Graf von Götzen. As a consequence of these events, the hitherto almost exclusively military governorship of the territory came to be reconsidered, and Albrecht von Rechenberg was confirmed as the first civilian governor of German East Africa, assuming his post in 1906. At the same time Bernard Dernburg, who later visited the colony, had been appointed head of the Foreign Office and was closely associated with him. Rechenberg saw the roots of the earlier rebellions as 'due to economic causes', since the natives had "no means available against an ordered government which takes no account of their economic conditions and existence" and leaves them "no choice save either to perish or to eliminate it through a rising". Rechenberg's pro-African plantation policy as a means of driving the economy, in opposition to that of the right-wing Reichstag, and settler driven ideal of a white man's country exploiting native labour, was a radical departure from previous policy.

His administration, as a result, carried out many genuine reforms, especially with regard to conditions and terms in the use of indigenous labour. In addition, while many settler voices were in favour of removing Indians and the coloured population, and replacing them with German or other similar stock, Rechenberg maintained friendly relations with them, refused to limit their immigration, and thought their involvement as middle traders an important contribution to the economy.

In these and many related issues he aroused the animosity of the settlers, and open hostility in the local German media, which saw him as a 'nigger-lover'. His manner was brusque and off-hand with the settlers and he did not attend a single meeting of the German Colonial Society. His aides in office also became targets of this ill-feeling and a series of attacks in the press during the latter part of his governorship in 1910 culminated in a number of successful libel actions against the source, Willy von Roy, the editor of the most widely read newspaper in the colony, the Deutsch-Ostafrikanische Zeitung, led initially by Wilhelm Methner, Rechenberg's first in command, and Knape, the acting senior judge (German:Regierungsrat), but later by Rechenberg himself, when accusations of homosexuality were levelled at him in the press.

Rechenberg's term as governor ended when he left Africa in 1911, after a period of five years or so without any significant native unrest, and with considerable advances in transportation, taxation, civil administration and economic expansion. According to his contemporary Frank Weston, Bishop of Zanzibar and Head of the Universities' Mission in German East Africa, known for his deep antipathy against the German colonialists, Governor von Rechenberg was "one of the best and most humane officials I have known."

== Later life ==
He was a member of the German Centre Party (German:Deutsche Zentrumspartei or just Zentrum) from 1913 to 1918, and was a German delegate to the League of Nations, where he campaigned for the return of the colonies lost by Germany after the First World War. He appears to have left political life after that, apart from a brief return to Warsaw as German ambassador to Poland in 1922. He died in a car accident in Berlin in February 1935 at the age of 73.
