= Anglo-Zanzibar War =

1896 military conflict in East Africa

- Part of the Scramble for Africa
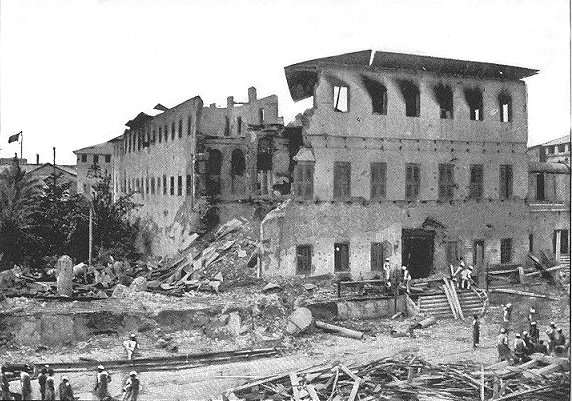
- The Sultan's palace after the bombardment
Date	27 August 1896; 09:02–09:40 (local mean time) (≈38 minutes)
Location	Zanzibar (now part of Tanzania)
Result	British victory

Belligerents
United Kingdom	Sultanate of Zanzibar

Commanders and leaders
(United Kingdom) Harry Rawson; (Sultanate of Zanzibar) Lloyd Mathews	(Sultanate of Zanzibar) Khalid bin Barghash; (Sultanate of Zanzibar) Saleh

Strength
Land: 1,050; Sea: 2 cruisers; 3 gunboats	Land: 2,800; 4 artillery pieces; 1 shore battery; Sea: HHS Glasgow, the royal yacht; 2 boats

Casualties and losses
1 British sailor wounded	500 killed or wounded (including civilians): 1 shore battery destroyed; HHS Glasgow sunk; 2 boat vessels destroyed

The Anglo-Zanzibar War was a military conflict fought between the United Kingdom and the Sultanate of Zanzibar on 27 August 1896. The conflict lasted between 38 and 45 minutes, marking it as the shortest recorded war in history. The immediate cause of the war was the suspicious death of the pro-British Sultan Hamad bin Thuwaini on 25 August 1896 and the subsequent succession of Sultan Khalid bin Barghash. The British authorities preferred Hamoud bin Mohammed, who was more favourable to British interests, as sultan. The agreement of 14 June 1890, instituting a British protectorate over Zanzibar, specified that a candidate for accession to the sultanate should obtain the permission of the British consul; Khalid had not fulfilled this requirement. The British considered this a casus belli and sent an ultimatum to Khalid demanding that he order his forces to stand down and leave the palace. In response, Khalid called up his palace guard and barricaded himself inside the palace.

The ultimatum expired at 09:00 local time on 27 August, by which time the British had gathered two cruisers, three gunboats, 150 marines and sailors, and 900 Zanzibaris in the harbour space, ready to surround the Sultan's palace. The Royal Navy contingent were under the command of Rear-Admiral Harry Rawson and the pro-Anglo Zanzibaris were commanded by Brigadier-General Lloyd Mathews of the Zanzibar army (who was also the First Minister of Zanzibar). Around 2,800 Zanzibaris defended the palace; most were recruited from the civilian population, but they also included the sultan's palace guards and several hundred of his servants and slaves. The defenders had several artillery pieces and machine guns, which were set in front of the palace sighted at the British ships. A bombardment, opened at 09:02, set the palace on fire and disabled the defending artillery. A small naval action took place, with the British sinking the Zanzibari royal yacht HHS Glasgow and two smaller vessels. Some shots were also fired ineffectually at the pro-British Zanzibari troops as they approached the palace. The flag at the palace was shot down and fire ceased at 09:46.

The sultan's forces sustained roughly 500 casualties, while only one British sailor was injured. Sultan Khalid received asylum in the German consulate before escaping to German East Africa (in the mainland part of present Tanzania). The British quickly placed Sultan Hamoud in power at the head of a puppet government. The war marked the end of the Sultanate of Zanzibar as a sovereign state and the start of a period of heavy British influence.

== Background ==
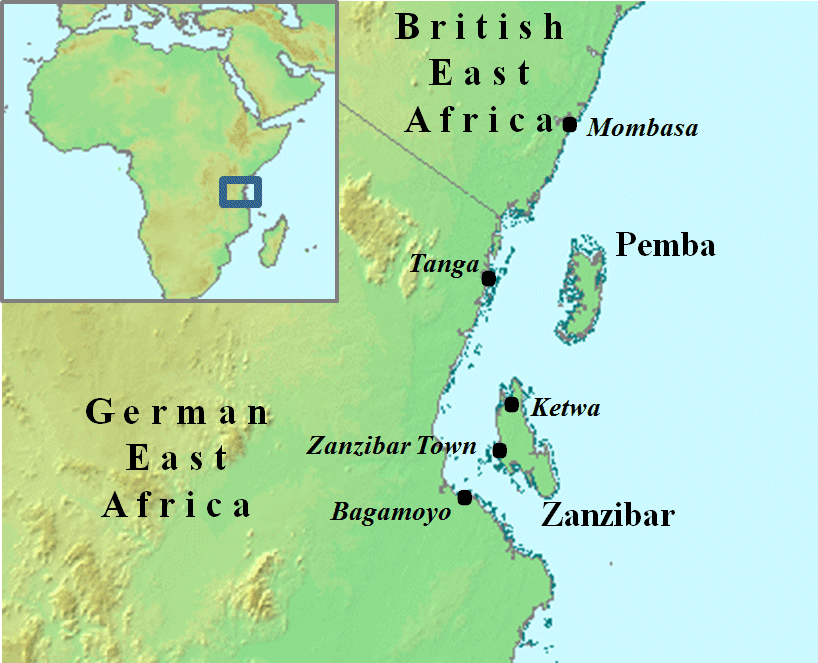
The islands of Zanzibar and the African mainland

Zanzibar was an island country in the Indian Ocean, off the coast of Tanganyika; today it forms part of Tanzania. The main island, Unguja (or Zanzibar Island), had been under the nominal control of the Sultans of Oman since 1698 when they expelled the Portuguese settlers who had claimed it in 1499. Sultan Majid bin Said declared the island independent from Oman in 1858, which was recognised by the United Kingdom, and split the sultanate from that of Oman. Barghash bin Said, the second sultan and Khalid's father, had been forced by British ultimatum and a threat of blockade to abolish the Zanzibar slave trade in June 1873, though it was later discovered that instructions from London would have prohibited aggressive action being taken immediately if that ultimatum had been rejected.

The subsequent sultans established their capital and seat of government at Zanzibar Town where a palace complex was built on the sea front. By 1896, this consisted of the palace itself; the Beit al-Hukm, an attached harem; and the Beit al-Ajaib or "House of Wonders"—a ceremonial palace said to be the first building in East Africa to be provided with electricity. The complex was mostly constructed of local timber and was not designed as a defensive structure. All three main buildings were adjacent to one another in a line and linked by wooden covered bridges above street height.

Britain had recognised Zanzibar's sovereignty and its sultanate in 1886, after a long period of friendly interaction, and generally maintained good relations with the country and its sultans. However, Germany was also interested in East Africa, and the two powers vied for control of trade rights and territory in the area throughout the late 19th century. Sultan Khalifah had granted rights to the land of Kenya to Britain and that of Tanganyika to Germany, a process resulting in the prohibition of slavery in those lands. Many of the Arab ruling classes were upset by this interruption of a valuable trade, which resulted in some unrest. In addition, the German authorities in Tanganyika refused to fly the flag of the Sultanate of Zanzibar, which led to armed clashes between German troops and the local population. One such conflict in Tanga claimed the lives of 20 Arabs.

Sultan Khalifah sent Zanzibari troops led by Brigadier-General Lloyd Mathews, a former lieutenant of the Royal Navy, to restore order in Tanganyika. The operation was largely successful, but anti-German feeling among the Zanzibari people remained strong. Further conflicts erupted at Bagamoyo, where 150 natives were killed by German military forces, and at Ketwa, where German officials and their servants were murdered. Khalifah then granted extensive trade rights to the Imperial British East Africa Company (IBEAC) who, with German assistance, established a naval blockade to halt the continuing domestic slave trade. Upon Khalifah's death in 1890 Ali bin Said ascended to the sultanate. Sultan Ali banned the domestic slave trade (but not slave ownership), declared Zanzibar a British protectorate and appointed Lloyd Mathews as First Minister to lead his cabinet. The British were also guaranteed a veto over the future appointment of sultans.

The year of Ali's ascension also saw the signing of the Heligoland–Zanzibar Treaty between Britain and Germany. This treaty officially demarcated the spheres of interest in East Africa and ceded Germany's rights in Zanzibar to the United Kingdom. This granted the British government more influence in Zanzibar, which they intended to use to eradicate slavery there, an objective they had held as early as 1804.

Sultan Ali's successor was Hamad bin Thuwaini, who became sultan in 1893. Hamad maintained a close relationship with the British, but there was dissent among his subjects over the increasing British control over the country, the British-led army and the abolition of the valuable slave trade. In order to control this dissent, the British authorities authorised the sultan to raise a Zanzibari palace bodyguard of 1,000 men, but these troops were soon involved in clashes with the British-led police. Complaints about the bodyguards' activities were also received from the European residents in Zanzibar Town.

=== 25 August 1896 ===
Sultan Hamad died suddenly at 11:40 EAT (08:40 UTC) on 25 August 1896. His 29-year-old nephew Khalid bin Bargash, who was suspected by some of his assassination, moved into the palace complex at Zanzibar Town without British approval, in contravention of the treaty agreed with Ali. The British government preferred an alternative candidate, Hamoud bin Muhammed, who was more favourably disposed towards them. Khalid was warned by the consul and diplomatic agent to Zanzibar, Basil Cave, and General Mathews to think carefully about his actions. This course of action had proved successful three years earlier when Khalid had tried to claim the sultanate after the death of Ali, and the British consul-general, Rennell Rodd, had persuaded him of the dangers of such an action.

Khalid ignored Cave's warning, and his forces began mustering in the Palace Square under the command of Captain Saleh of the palace bodyguard. By the end of the day, they numbered 2,800 men armed with rifles and muskets. The majority were civilians, but the force included 700 Zanzibari Askari soldiers who had sided with Khalid. The sultan's artillery, which consisted of several Maxim machine guns, a Gatling gun, a 17th-century bronze cannon, and two 12-pounder field guns, was aimed at the British ships in the harbour. The 12-pounders had been presented to the sultan by Wilhelm II, the German emperor. The sultan's troops also took possession of the Zanzibari Navy, which consisted of one wooden sloop, the HHS Glasgow, based on the British frigate Glasgow and built as a royal yacht for the sultan in 1878.

Mathews and Cave also began to muster their forces, already commanding 900 Zanzibari askaris under Lieutenant Arthur Edward Harington Raikes of the Wiltshire Regiment who was seconded to the Zanzibar Army and held the rank of brigadier-general. 150 sailors and marines were landed from the Pearl-class protected cruiser Philomel and the gunboat Thrush, which were anchored in the harbour. The naval contingent, under the command of Captain O'Callaghan, came ashore within fifteen minutes of being requested to deal with any rioting caused by the general population. A smaller contingent of sailors under Lieutenant Watson of Thrush were put ashore to guard the British consulate, where British citizens were requested to gather for protection. HMS Sparrow, another gunboat, entered the harbour and was anchored opposite the palace next to Thrush.

Some concerns were raised among the British diplomats as to the reliability of Raikes' askaris, but they proved to be steady and professional troops hardened by military drill and several expeditions to East Africa. They later became the only land troops to be fired upon by the defenders. Raikes' troops were armed with two Maxim guns and a nine pounder cannon, and were stationed at the nearby customs house. The sultan attempted to have the US consul, Richard Dorsey Mohun, recognise his accession, but the messenger was told:

...as his accession had not been verified by Her Majesty's government, it is impossible to reply.

Cave continued to send messages to Khalid requesting that he stand down his troops, leave the palace and return home, but these were ignored, and Khalid replied that he would proclaim himself sultan at 15:00. Cave stated that this would constitute an act of rebellion and that Khalid's sultanate would not be recognised by the British government. At 14:30, Sultan Hamad was buried, and exactly 30 minutes later a royal salute from the palace guns proclaimed Khalid's succession. Cave could not open hostilities without government approval and telegraphed the following message to the Foreign Office of Lord Salisbury's administration in London:

Are we authorised in the event of all attempts at a peaceful solution proving useless, to fire on the Palace from the men-of-war?

Meanwhile, Cave informed all other foreign consuls that all flags were to remain at half mast in honour of the late Hamad. The only one that did not was a large red flag flying from Khalid's palace. Cave also informed the consuls not to recognise Khalid as sultan, to which they agreed.

=== 26 August ===
At 10:00 on 26 August, the Archer-class protected cruiser Racoon arrived at Zanzibar Town and was anchored in line with Thrush and Sparrow. At 14:00, the Edgar-class protected cruiser St George, flagship of the Cape of Good Hope and West Africa Station, steamed into the harbour. On board were Rear-Admiral Harry Rawson, the commander-in-chief, and further British marines and sailors. At around the same time Lord Salisbury's reply arrived authorising Cave and Rawson to use the resources at their disposal to remove Khalid from power. The telegraph read: "You are authorised to adopt whatever measures you may consider necessary, and will be supported in your action by Her Majesty's Government. Do not, however, attempt to take any action which you are not certain of being able to accomplish successfully."

Cave attempted further negotiations with Khalid, but these failed and Rawson sent an ultimatum, requiring him to haul down his flag and leave the palace by 09:00 on 27 August or he would open fire. During the afternoon, all merchant vessels were cleared from the harbour and the British women and children removed to St George and a British-India Steam Navigation Company vessel for their safety. That night, Consul Mohun noted that: "The silence which hung over Zanzibar was appalling. Usually drums were beating or babies cried but that night there was absolutely not a sound."

== War ==
Dispositions of naval forces at 09.00

At 08:00 on the morning of 27 August, after a messenger sent by Khalid requested parley from Cave, the consul replied that he would only have salvation if he agreed to the terms of the ultimatum. At 08:30 a further messenger from Khalid declared that "We have no intention of hauling down our flag and we do not believe you would open fire on us"; Cave replied that "We do not want to open fire, but unless you do as you are told we shall certainly do so." At 08:55, having received no further word from the palace, aboard St George Rawson hoisted the signal "prepare for action".

At exactly 09:00, General Lloyd Mathews ordered the British ships to commence the bombardment. At 09:02 Her Majesty's Ships Racoon, Thrush and Sparrow opened fire at the palace simultaneously. Thrush's first shot immediately dismounted an Arab 12-pounder cannon. Three thousand defenders, servants and slaves were present in the largely wooden palace, and even with barricades of crates, bales and rubber, there were many casualties from the high explosive shells. Despite initial reports that he had been captured and was to be exiled to India, Sultan Khalid escaped from the palace. A Reuters news correspondent reported that the sultan had "fled at the first shot with all the leading Arabs, who left their slaves and followers to carry on the fighting", but other sources state that he remained in the palace for longer. The shelling ceased at around 09:40, by which time the palace and attached harem had caught fire, the Sultan's artillery had been silenced and his flag cut down.

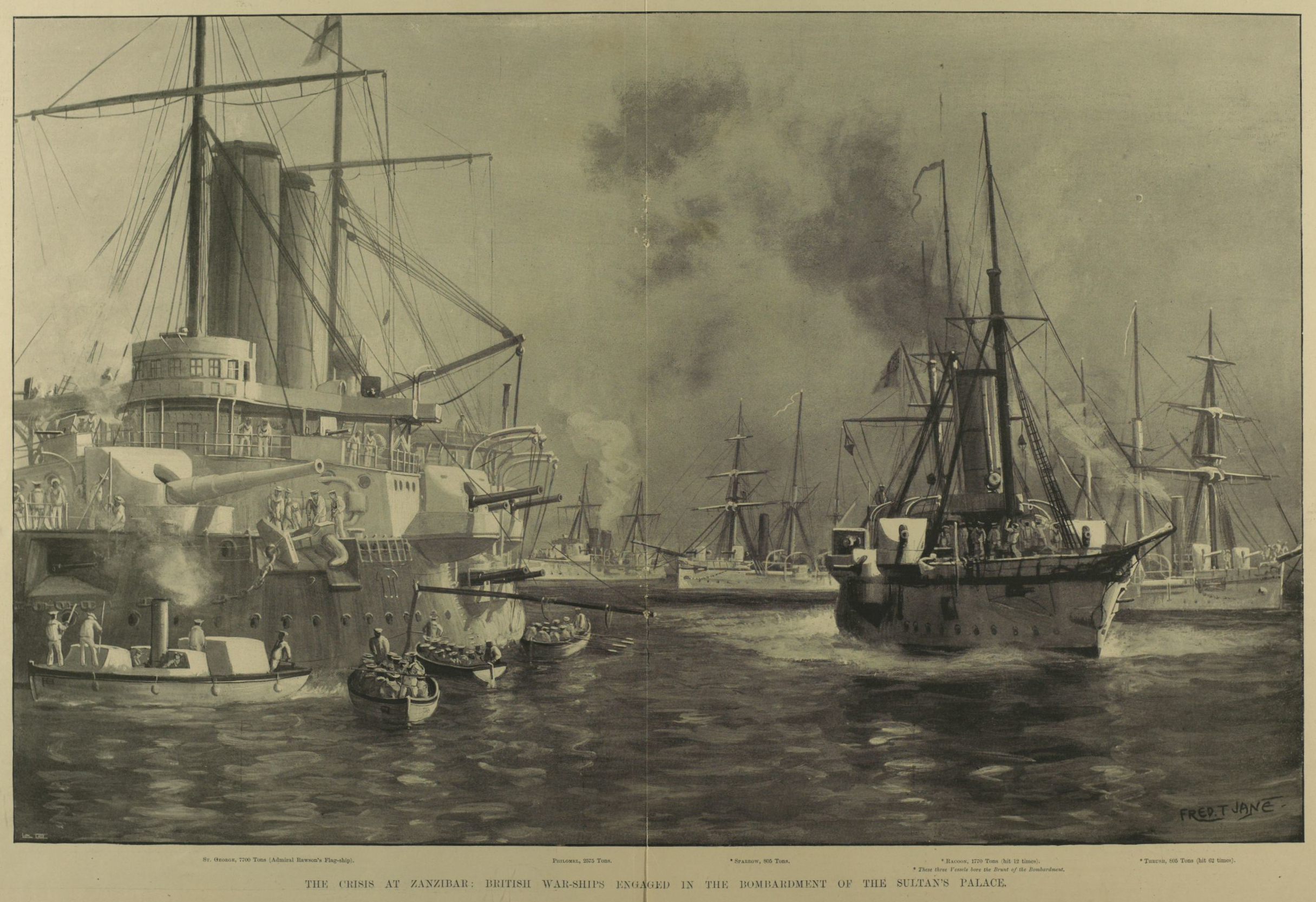
A contemporary depiction of the five British ships during the bombardment

During the bombardment a small naval engagement occurred when, at 09:05, the obsolete Glasgow fired upon the St George using her armament of 7 nine-pounder guns and a Gatling gun, which had been a present from Queen Victoria to the sultan. The return fire caused Glasgow to sink, though the shallow harbour meant that her masts remained out of the water. Glasgow's crew hoisted a British flag as a token of their surrender, and they were all rescued by British sailors in launches. Thrush also sank two steam launches whose Zanzibari crews shot at her with rifles. Some land fighting occurred when Khalid's men fired on Raikes' askaris, with little effect, as they approached the palace. The fighting ceased with the end of the shelling. The British controlled the town and the palace, and by the afternoon Hamoud bin Muhammed, an Arab favourable to the British, had been installed as sultan with much reduced powers. The British ships and crews had fired around 500 shells, 4,100 machine gun rounds and 1,000 rifle rounds during the engagement.

== Aftermath ==
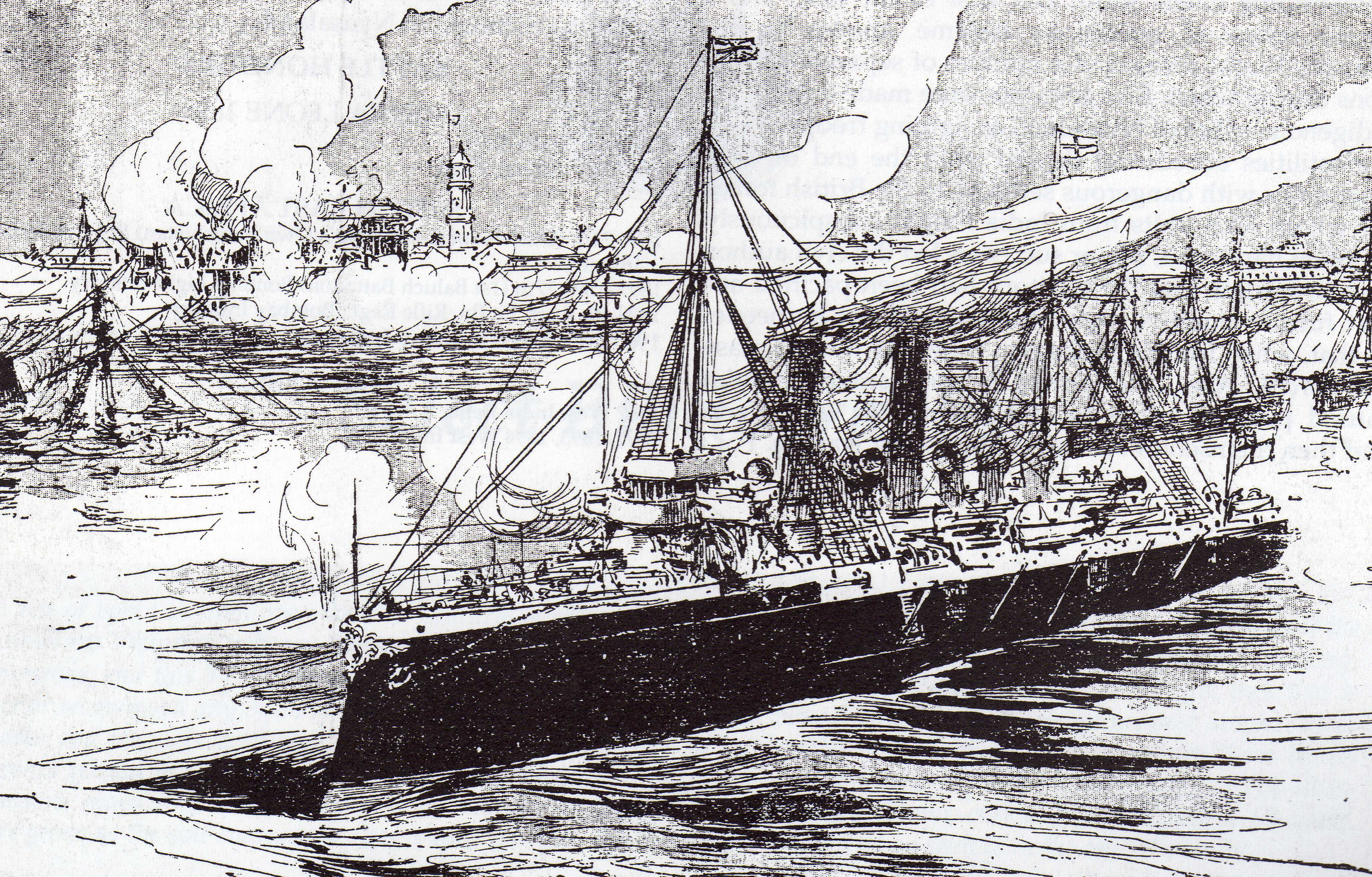
The bombing of Stone Town in an 1896 British newspaper

Approximately 500 Zanzibari men and women were killed or wounded during the bombardment, most of the dead a result of the fire that engulfed the palace. It is unknown how many of these casualties were combatants, but Khalid's gun crews were said to have been "decimated". British casualties amounted to one petty officer severely wounded aboard Thrush who later recovered. Although the majority of the Zanzibari townspeople sided with the British, the town's Indian quarter suffered from opportunistic looting, and around twenty inhabitants died in the chaos. To restore order, 150 British Sikh troops were transferred from Mombasa to patrol the streets. Sailors from St George and Philomel were landed to form a fire brigade to contain the fire, which had spread from the palace to the nearby customs sheds. There was some concern about the fire at the customs sheds as they contained a sizeable store of explosives, but no explosion occurred.

Khalid, Saleh and around forty followers sought refuge in the German consulate following their flight from the palace, where they were guarded by ten armed German sailors and marines while Mathews stationed men outside to arrest them if they tried to leave. Despite extradition requests, the German consul, the recently posted Albrecht von Rechenberg, later Governor of German East Africa, refused to surrender Khalid to the British as his country's extradition treaty with Britain specifically excluded political prisoners. Instead, the German consul promised to remove Khalid to German East Africa without him "setting foot on the soil of Zanzibar". At 10:00 on 2 October, SMS Seeadler of the Imperial German Navy arrived in port; at high tide, one of Seeadler's boats made it up to the consulate's garden gate, and Khalid stepped directly from consular grounds to a German war vessel and hence was free from arrest. He was transferred from the boat onto Seeadler and was then taken to Dar es Salaam in German East Africa. Khalid was captured by British forces in 1916, during the East African Campaign of World War I, and exiled to Seychelles and Saint Helena before being allowed to return to East Africa, where he died at Mombasa in 1927. The British punished Khalid's supporters by forcing them to pay reparations to cover the cost of shells fired against them and for damages caused by the looting, which amounted to 300,000 rupees.

Sultan Hamoud was loyal to the British and acted as a figurehead for an essentially British-run government, the sultanate only being retained to avoid the costs involved with running Zanzibar directly as a crown colony. Several months after the war, Hamoud, with British prompting, abolished slavery in all its forms. The emancipation of slaves required them to present themselves to a government office and proved a slow process—within ten years only 17,293 slaves had been freed, from an estimated population of 60,000 in 1891.

The badly damaged palace complex was completely changed by the war. The harem, lighthouse and palace were demolished as the bombardment had left them unsafe. The palace site became an area of gardens, while a new palace was erected on the site of the harem. The House of Wonders was almost undamaged and would later become the main secretariat for the British governing authorities. During renovation work on the House of Wonders in 1897, a clocktower was added to its frontage to replace the lighthouse lost to the shelling. The wreck of Glasgow remained in the harbour in front of the palace, where the shallow waters ensured that her masts would remain visible for several years to come; it was eventually broken up for scrap in 1912.

The British protagonists were highly regarded by the governments in London and Zanzibar for their actions leading up to and during the war, and many were rewarded with appointments and honours. General Raikes, leader of the askaris, was appointed a First Class (Second Grade) member of the Order of the Brilliant Star of Zanzibar on 24 September 1896, a First Class member of the Zanzibari Order of Hamondieh on 25 August 1897 and later promoted to Commander of the Zanzibar armies. General Mathews, the Zanzibari army commander, was appointed a member of the Grand Order of Hamondieh on 25 August 1897 and became First Minister and Treasurer to the Zanzibari government. Basil Cave, the consul, was appointed a Companion of the Order of the Bath on 1 January 1897 and promoted to consul-general on 9 July 1903. Harry Rawson was appointed a Knight Commander of the Order of the Bath for his work in Zanzibar and would later be Governor of New South Wales in Australia. Rawson was also appointed a first class member of the Order of the Brilliant Star of Zanzibar on 8 February 1897 and the Order of Hamondieh on 18 June 1898. There were no further rebellions against British influence during the remaining 67 years of the protectorate.

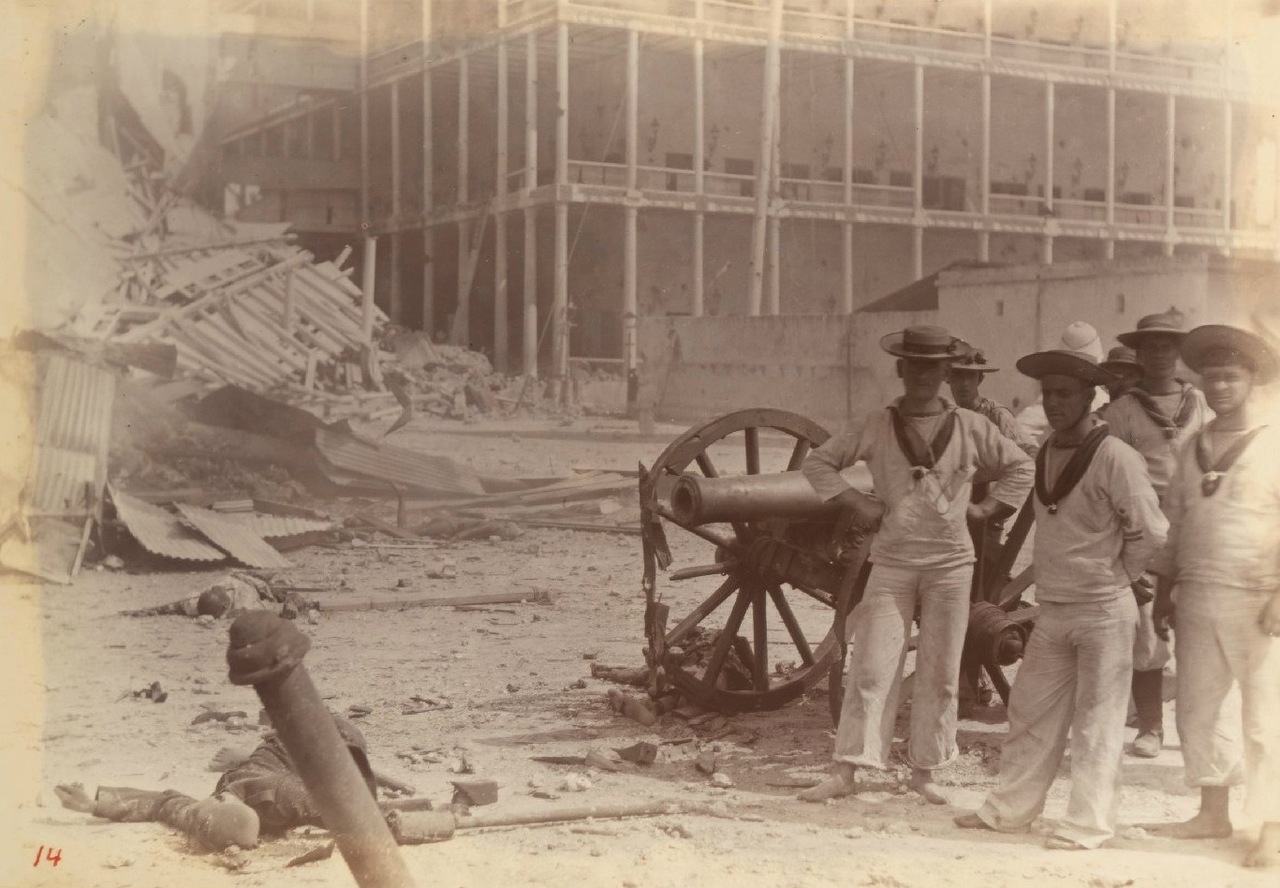
British sailors pose with a captured cannon outside the sultan's palace

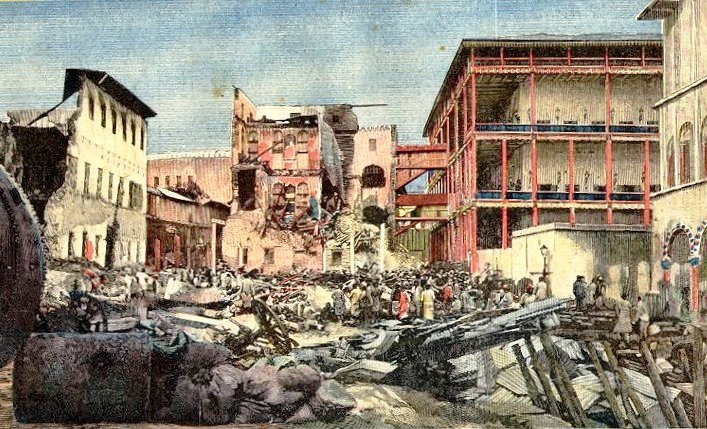
The palace complex following the bombardment

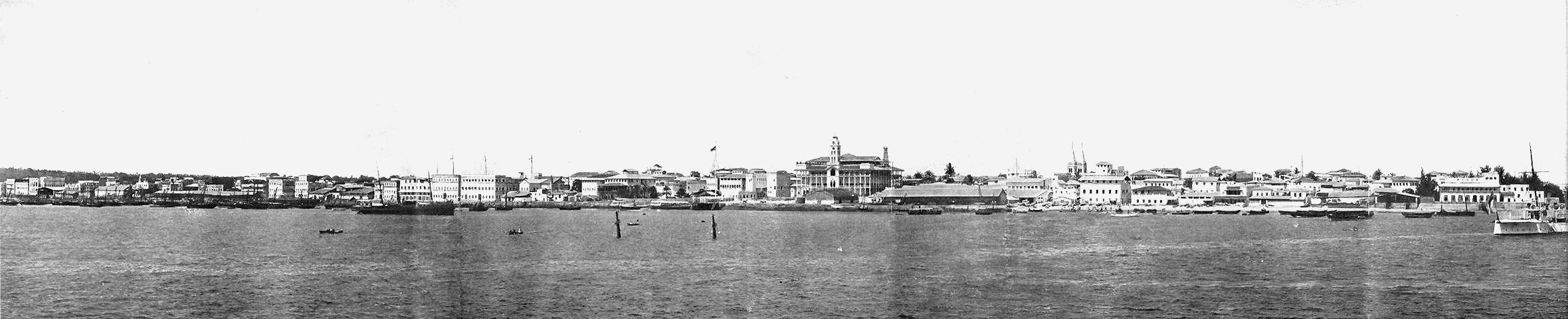
The masts of the sunken Glasgow can be seen in this panorama of Zanzibar Town harbour taken in 1902, looking east. The House of Wonders is the white building with a tower and many balconies in the middle of the photograph; the harem and palace stood to the left. The consulate buildings are to the right.

== Duration ==
The war, lasting less than three-quarters of an hour, is considered the shortest in recorded history. Several durations are given by sources, including 38, 40 and 45 minutes, but the 38-minute duration is the most often quoted. The variation is due to confusion over what actually constitutes the start and end of a war. Some sources take the start of the war as the order to open fire at 09:00 and some with the start of actual firing at 09:02. The end of the war is usually put at 09:40, when the last shots were fired and the palace flag struck, but some sources place it at 09:45. The logbooks of the British ships also suffer from this uncertainty with St George indicating that cease-fire was called and Khalid entered the German consulate at 09:35, Thrush at 09:40, Racoon at 09:41, and Philomel and Sparrow at 09:45.

== See also ==
- Blockade of Zanzibar
- List of conflicts by duration

== Bibliography ==
- Bakari, Mohammed Ali (2001), The Democratisation Process in Zanzibar: A Retarded Transition, Hamburg: Institut für Afrika-Kunde, ISBN 978-3-928049-71-9.
- Bennett, Norman Robert (1978), A History of the Arab State of Zanzibar, London: Methuen Publishing, ISBN 978-0-416-55080-1.
- Cohen, John; Jacopetti, Gualtiero; Prosperi, Franco (1966), Africa Addio, New York: Ballantine Books, OCLC 230433.
- Frankl, P. J. L. (2006), "The Exile of Sayyid Khalid bin Barghash Al-BuSa'idi", British Journal of Middle Eastern Studies, 33 (2): 161–177, doi:10.1080/13530190600603675, ISSN 1469-3542, S2CID 159934039.
- Gordon, Philip H. (2007), Winning the Right War: The Path to Security for America and the World, New York: Times Books, ISBN 978-0-8050-8657-7.
- Haws, Duncan; Hurst, Alexander Anthony (1985), The Maritime History of the World: A Chronological Survey of Maritime Events from 5,000 B.C. until the Present Day, Brighton, Sussex: Teredo Books, ISBN 978-0-903662-10-9.
- Hernon, Ian (2000), The Savage Empire: Forgotten Wars of the 19th Century, Stroud, Gloucestershire: Sutton Publishing, ISBN 978-0-7509-2480-1.
- Hernon, Ian (2003), Britain's Forgotten Wars: Colonial Campaigns of the 19th Century, Stroud, Gloucestershire: Sutton Publishing, ISBN 978-0-7509-3162-5.
- Hoyle, Brian (2002), "Urban Waterfront Revitalization in Developing Countries: The Example of Zanzibar's Stone Town", Geographical Journal, 168 (2): 141–162, Bibcode:2002GeogJ.168..141H, doi:10.1111/1475-4959.00044.
- Ingrams, William H. (1967), Zanzibar: Its History and Its People, London: Cass, OCLC 722777.
- Lyne, Robert Nunez (1905), Zanzibar in Contemporary Times, London: Hurst and Blackett, OCLC 251506750.
- Owens, Geoffrey R. (2007), "Exploring the Articulation of Governmentality and Sovereignty: The Chwaka Road and the Bombardment of Zanzibar, 1895–1896", Journal of Colonialism and Colonial History, 7 (2), Johns Hopkins University Press: 1–55, doi:10.1353/cch.2007.0036, ISSN 1532-5768, OCLC 45037899, S2CID 162991362, archived from the original on 3 March 2016.
- Patience, Kevin (1994), Zanzibar and the Shortest War in History, Bahrain: Kevin Patience, OCLC 37843635.
- Thompson, Cecil (1984), "The Sultans of Zanzibar", Tanzania Notes and Records (94).
- Tucker, Alfred R. (1970), Eighteen Years in Uganda and East Africa (New ed.), Westport, Connecticut: Negro Universities Press, ISBN 978-0-8371-3280-8.
