= Basil Cave =

British consul

Sir Basil Cave KCMG CB FRGS
- Photograph of Cave taken in 1930

Vice-Consul of British East Africa
- In office 20 March 1891 – 1 June 1895

British Consul to Zanzibar
- In office 1 June 1895 – 9 July 1903

British Consul-General to Zanzibar
- In office 9 July 1903 – 1 April 1909

British Consul-General to Algeria
- In office 1 April 1909 – unknown

Personal details
- Born: Basil Shillito Cave; 14 November 1865 Mill Hill, Middlesex, England
- Died: 9 October 1931 (aged 65) Tunbridge Wells, Kent

Sir Basil Shillito Cave KCMG CB FRGS (14 November 1865 – 9 October 1931) was a British consul. He was the son of Thomas Cave, a Liberal Member of Parliament, and one of his brothers was George Cave who would become a Conservative Home Secretary and a Viscount. Basil Cave worked for the Foreign Office as a civil servant and was appointed Vice-Consul of British East Africa in 1891. In 1893 he was placed in command of a number of soldiers during civil disorder on Zanzibar and in 1895 was appointed Consul to the country. The Consul-General, AH Hardinge being away, Cave was responsible for starting the Anglo-Zanzibar War in 1896. He issued an ultimatum to Khalid bin Barghash who had seized the throne on the death of Sultan Hamad. The resulting 38-minute war, the shortest in history, ended with victory for Britain and the installation of their chosen Sultan, Hamoud bin Mohammed.

Cave was rewarded with appointment as a Companion of the Order of the Bath in 1897 and accompanied Zanzibari Prince Ali bin Hamud to the coronation of King Edward VII in 1902. He received promotion to Consul-General in 1903 and issued orders that resulted in the quelling of a mutiny in the Sultan's army in 1907. He left the country in 1909, being posted to Algeria where he was said to have worked hard to "strengthen the friendship between the French and the British peoples". Cave was made a Knight Commander of the Order of St Michael and St George in 1925 and was also a Fellow of the Royal Geographical Society.

== Early career ==
Basil Cave was born on 14 November 1865. He was the son of Thomas Cave, the Liberal Member of Parliament (MP) for Barnstaple. Basil had five sisters and four brothers, including George Cave, who was a distinguished lawyer, Conservative MP, Home Secretary in David Lloyd George's First World War coalition government, and a Viscount. George Cave would later marry the sister of Lloyd Mathews, who was well acquainted with Basil (Cave was present at his bedside when he died in 1901) and served as First Minister of Zanzibar for much of his posting there.

Basil Cave was a civil servant with the British Foreign Office and on 20 March 1891 was appointed Vice-Consul of "British Sphere in East Africa, situated to the north of the German Sphere, to reside at Mombasa". On 19 February 1892 he married Mary Creighton McClellan at the Consulate on Zanzibar, with a blessing following at Christ Church Anglican cathedral. The couple had two children, Joy Mary Cave and Kenneth McClellan Cave, Kenneth later served in the Royal Artillery, reaching the rank of Brevet Major and winning the Military Cross.

Upon the death of Ali bin Said of Zanzibar on 5 March 1893 it was decided to land 200 British marines to maintain order, looting and violence being customary upon the death of a Sultan, and to ensure the succession of Hamad bin Thuwaini. During these events Cave was placed in command of a guard of marines and native soldiers at the British Agency.

== Anglo-Zanzibar War ==
Are we authorised in the event of all attempts at a peaceful solution proving useless, to fire on the Palace from the men-of-war?

— Cave's message to the Foreign Office requesting authority to start the Anglo-Zanzibar War

Cave became the resident Consul of Zanzibar on 1 June 1895, facing a significant diplomatic crisis the next year. On 25 August Sultan of Zanzibar Hamad bin Thuwaini died, his nephew Khalid proclaiming himself sultan. The British authorities had the right to appoint the Sultan and had chosen Hamoud bin Mohammed. The Consul-General, AH Hardinge, was away in Britain at the time and it fell to Cave, as the most senior British diplomat present, to issue a warning to Khalid. He did so in person at the Sultan's palace alongside General Mathews, but was ignored and Khalid began fortifying the area. Cave continued to send messages to Khalid informing him that the British government considered this an act of rebellion and requesting that he stand down his troops and renounce the office of the sultan. This was ignored and Cave telegraphed his superiors at the Foreign Office for authorisation to use force. He also informed all other foreign official not to recognise Khalid, to which they agreed. During this time of unrest Mrs Cave lent her sitting rooms at the consulate as a refuge for the European ladies of the town and instructed her cook to provide for them.

You are authorised to adopt whatever measures you may consider necessary, and will be supported in your action by Her Majesty's Government. Do not, however, attempt to take any action which you are not certain of being able to accomplish successfully.

— Lord Salisbury's reply to Cave's telegraph

The British government's approval came the next day and Cave received reinforcements in the form of a small flotilla of Royal Navy vessels led by Rear-Admiral Harry Rawson. Cave entered further negotiations with Khalid but these proved unsuccessful and he was forced to issue an ultimatum to leave by 9 am the next morning or he would open fire. On the morning of 27 August Cave refused further attempts at compromise from Khalid and, receiving the message that "We have no intention of hauling down our flag and we do not believe you would open fire on us"; Cave replied "We do not want to open fire, but unless you do as you are told we shall certainly do so". At 9.02 the bombardment of the palace commenced, signalling the start of the Anglo-Zanzibar War. The war, the shortest in history, ended 38 minutes later after 500 defenders had been killed or wounded and the palace set alight, without British loss.

Khalid fled the palace and, with some of his supporters, sought refuge at the German consulate. The Germans refused to extradite Khalid and eventually, despite Cave's protests, he was smuggled out by the German Navy to Dar es Salaam in German East Africa.

== Post-war Zanzibar ==
Having successfully installed the chosen sultan, Hamoud, Cave was rewarded with appointment as a Companion of the Order of the Bath on 1 January 1897. He was active in campaigning against slavery in Zanzibar, which was finally abolished in 1897. One of Cave's duties was to accompany Prince Ali bin Hamud to Britain as a representative of Hamoud at the coronation of King Edward VII in 1902. Hamoud died whilst Cave and Ali were en route and Cave informed the Prince once they reached Djibouti on the return journey. It was also his responsibility to formally inform Ali that the British government had chosen him as his father's successor and that Mr A. Rogers, the First Minister, would act as regent until Ali was 21.

Cave was promoted to Consul-General on 9 July 1903, with the role of commercial agent being added to his duties on 8 July 1904. During a mutiny of the Zanzibar Army in 1907 Cave received a request for British assistance from the Sultan and, no British vessel being within 100 miles of the island, was forced to ask for assistance from the German Navy. The Germans responded, sending a vessel to the Stone Town harbour which overawed the mutineers and allowed their officers to restore order.

== Later life ==
Cave left Zanzibar in 1909, being appointed Consul-General for Algeria, resident at Algiers, on 1 April. His efforts in that country resulted in Lieutenant-General Gordon Casserly dedicating his book "Algeria To-day" to Cave and his wife "in token of admiration of the good work that they have done for the empire by their efforts to strengthen the friendship between the French and the British peoples". Cave was appointed a Knight Commander of the Order of St Michael and St George on 1 January 1925, allowing him to use the title of "Sir". Cave was also a Fellow of the Royal Geographical Society. Basil Cave died in 1931; two photographs of him are in the collection of the National Portrait Gallery.

== Bibliography ==
- Bennett, Norman Robert (1978), A History of the Arab State of Zanzibar, London: Methuen Publishing, ISBN 978-0-416-55080-1.
- Casserly, Lieutenant-Colonel Gordon (1923), Algeria Today, New York: Frederick A Stokes Company, OCLC 869415407.
- Frankl, P.J.L. (2006), "The Exile of Sayyid Khalid bin Barghash Al-BuSa'idi", British Journal of Middle Eastern Studies, 33 (2): 161–177, doi:10.1080/13530190600603675, ISSN 1469-3542, S2CID 159934039.
- Hernon, Ian (2003), Britain's Forgotten Wars: Colonial Campaigns of the 19th Century, Stroud, Gloucestershire: Sutton Publishing, ISBN 978-0-7509-3162-5.
- Ingrams, William H. (1967), Zanzibar: Its History and Its People, London: Cass, OCLC 722777.
- Lyne, Robert Nunez (1905), Zanzibar in Contemporary Times, London: Hurst and Blackett, OCLC 251506750.
- Owens, Geoffrey R. (2007), "Exploring the Articulation of Governmentality and Sovereignty: The Chwaka Road and the Bombardment of Zanzibar, 1895–1896", Journal of Colonialism and Colonial History, 7 (2), Johns Hopkins University Press: 1–55, doi:10.1353/cch.2007.0036, ISSN 1532-5768, OCLC 45037899, S2CID 162991362.
- Patience, Kevin (1994), Zanzibar and the Shortest War in History, Bahrain: Kevin Patience, OCLC 37843635.
- Rodd, Sir James Rennell (1922), Social and diplomatic memories, London: Edward Arnold & Co, OCLC 18920024.
- Thompson, Cecil (1984), "The Sultans of Zanzibar", Tanzania Notes and Records (94).
- Turki, Benyan Saud (1997), "The Sultan of The Arab State of Zanzibar and The Regent 1902 – 1905" (PDF), Journal of the Documentation and Humanities Research Center (178), archived from the original (PDF) on 16 March 2012.
- Younghusband, Ethel (1910), Glimpses of East Africa and Zanzibar, London: John Long, OCLC 663396352.
