= Blockade of Zanzibar =

Naval Blockade on Zanzibar (1888–1889)

- Part of the Scramble for Africa
- Portuguese navy in the Zanzibar blockade, 1889
Date	November 1888 – October 1889
Location	East Africa
Result	Coalition victory

Belligerents
German Empire; British Empire; Portuguese Empire; Kingdom of Italy	Sultanate of Zanzibar

Commanders and leaders
(German Empire) Karl August Deinhard (British Empire) Edmund Fremantle; Augusto de Castilho (Kingdom of Italy) Francesco Preve	Sultan Khalifa bin Said

Strength
25 warships (Note: 1 turret ironclad, 3 cruisers, 8 corvettes, 10 gunboats, 1 sloop, 2 aviso ships); ~4,200 men (Note: ~1,500 Germans, ~1,500 British and 1,200 Portuguese)	Unknown

Casualties and losses
Minimal	Minimal

The blockade of Zanzibar (1888–1889) was a joint international operation led by Germany, with the support of the British Empire, Portugal and Italy, against the Sultanate of Zanzibar, with the aim of ending the slave and arms trade off the eastern coast of Africa.

This coalition aimed to coerce Sultan Khalifa bin Said of Zanzibar into rigorously enforcing existing treaties that prohibited the maritime slave trade and the illicit arms trade emanating from his East African dominions. The action followed the 1886 Anglo-German Agreement of 1886, which delineated British and German spheres of influence on the mainland, increasing pressure on the Sultanate.

== Background ==
=== Anglo-German Agreement of 1886 ===
Two years earlier, in 29 October – 1 November 1886, an agreement was made between the British and German governments to prevent the Germans from taking over the whole of East Africa. The two agreed to limit the Sultan of Zanzibar's mainland territory to a ten-mile wide coastal strip. In the interior, the German sphere would extend from the Umba River to Lake Victoria Nyanza in the north and to the Rovuma River in the south, while the British sphere would extend from the German boundary up to the Juba River in the north.

Later, the coastal territories of the Sultanate were administered and operated by the Imperial British East Africa Company (IBEAC), since 1887, and by the German East Africa Company (DOAG), since April 28, 1888. The agreement divided the Sultanate into the British to the north (Kenya), and the Germans to the south (Tanzania).

== Blockade ==
=== Early stages ===
Following the expansion of the German East Africa Company over three years, a revolt, known as Abushiri revolt, began in August 1888, which sparked the initiative for a blockade by the Germans.

Realizing they could not solve the problem alone, the German Empire developed a diplomatic action, inviting the British Empire. Germany argued for British involvement to defend their company's interests and securing their northern territories. Prince Bismarck also invited to join in the blockade the Cabinets of Paris, Lisbon, Brussels, and Rome.

On November 5, just two days after receiving the German memorandum, the British agreed to support a naval blockade, though it refused to intervene on land, which would prevent not only the slave trade, but also the supply of arms and ammunition from the Arab nations via the Red Sea and the Indian Ocean.

=== Portugal joins the alliance ===
On November 8, 1888, the Baron de Waecker-Gotter, German ambassador to Lisbon, in the name of the Prince of Bismarck, delivered a dispatch to Henrique de Barros Gomes, Minister of Foreign Affairs, with an invitation to take part in the blockade.

On the 16th, George Glynn Petre, ambassador of the United Kingdom to Portugal, also supported the idea to the Portuguese Minister. That same day, Barros Gomes replied to the German ambassador that Portugal would not decline the invitation.

Two days later, on the 18th, he also replied to Petre, that for this objective, the blockade on the east coast of Africa should be extended to include a part of the coast of Mozambique.

=== Italy joins the alliance ===
Unlike Portugal, the Italians did not join the blockade to patrol their own coastline in Somalia, but rather to patrol in the German and British areas, which required less naval units.

The Kingdom of Italy, however, had its own reasons for joining the blockade. On one hand, to secure its interests along the Somali coast, and on the other, to continue its fight against the slave trade.

== Aftermath ==
It is known that in April 1889, 1,282 dhows were boarded and inspected by the Royal Navy, and about 1,500 by the German navy. According to Chériau:

...despite such a demonstration of force, and much to the embarrassment of Admiral Fremantle, the results of the blockade seemed meager.

Only one ship was seized with weapons, and another, under a French flag, with three slaves on board.

In December 1888, the German corvette Carola captured a dhow carrying 84 slaves and 17 Arabs. The Arabs resisted, killing three German sailors, but were defeated.

Faced with the international squadron, Sultan Khalifa bin Said capitulated, issuing a decree banning the seaborne slave trade and permitting foreign warships to search suspected dhows. The blockade significantly disrupted these trades, though it required the later installation of a more compliant sultan, Ali bin Said, to ensure sustained enforcement.

== Fleet ==
=== German fleet ===
Name	Date	Type	Ton.	Guns
Leipzig	1875/88	corvette/frigate cruiser	3930	18
Schwalbe	1887	unarmed cruiser	2159	14
Sophie	1881	corvette	2169	16
Olga	1880	corvette	2386	14
Carola	1880	corvette	2169	14
Möwe	1880	gunboat	848	5
Pfeil	1881	aviso	1328	5

Comprising seven ships, the fleet was under command of Rear Admiral Karl August Deinhard. Meanwhile, the Leipzig was, during the blockade, under Captain Franz Strauch (August 1888 – February 1889), Lieutenant Commander Hermann da Fonseca-Wollheim (February 1889 – March 1889), and Captain Max Plüddemann (March 1889 — November 1890).

=== British fleet ===
Name	Date	Type	Ton.	Guns
Boadicea	1876	corvette	4140	24
Agamemnon	1879	turret ironclad	8510	18
Garnet	1877	corvette	2120	14
Penguin	1876	sloop	1130	7
Mariner	1884	gunboat	973	10
Algerine	1880	gunboat	835	4
Griffon	1876	gunboat	780	8
Stork	1876	gunboat	465	4

Comprising eight ships, the fleet was under command of Rear Admiral Edmund Fremantle. The flagship Boadicea, however, was under Captain Assheton Curzon-Howe.

=== Portuguese fleet ===
Name	Date	Type	Ton.	Guns
Afonso de Albuquerque	1884	corvette	1150	13
Mindelo	1875	corvette	1120	8
Rainha de Portugal	1875	corvette	1120	8
Liberal	1884	gunboat	500	4
Zaire	1884	gunboat	500	4
Quanza	1877	gunboat	590	3
Tâmega	1875	gunboat	610	5
Douro	1873	gunboat	590	2

Comprising eight ships, it was the largest squadron, along with the British, led by Governor-General of Mozambique Augusto Castilho. Although a Navy officer, Castilho did not board any of the ships, so the command would be assumed by the Chief of the Naval Division, Captain José Alemão de Mendonça.

=== Italian fleet ===
Name	Date	Type	Ton.	Guns
Dogali	1885	protected torpedo cruiser	2050	15
Archimede	1876	aviso	720	4

It was the smallest naval force of the blockade, comprising only two ships, with the cruiser R.M. Dogali under command of Frigate Captain Francesco Preve.

== Bibliography ==
- Saldanha, Nuno (2024). "The Blockade of Zanzibar (1888-1889)". academia.edu.
- Cheriau, Raphaël (May 3, 2021). Imperial Powers and Humanitarian Interventions. Routledge. ISBN 9781000383010.
