= Khalid bin Barghash of Zanzibar =

Sultan of Zanzibar in 1896

Khalid bin Barghash خالد بن برغش (Arabic)
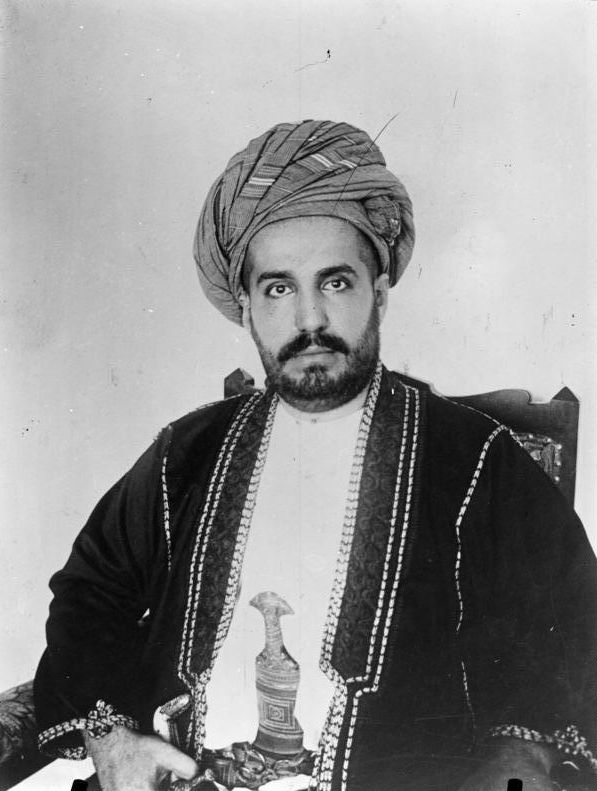
- Photograph c. 1906–1918

Sultan of Zanzibar
- Reign: 25–27 August 1896
- Predecessor: Hamad bin Thuwaini
- Successor: Hamoud bin Mohammed
- Born: 1874; Zanzibar
- Died: 19 March 1927 (aged 52–53); Mombasa, Colony and Protectorate of Kenya
Names
- Sayyid Khalid bin Barghash Al-Busa'id
- House: Al Bu Said
- Father: Barghash bin Said
- Religion: Ibadi Islam

Sayyid Khalid bin Barghash Al-Busa'id (Arabic: خالد بن برغش البوسعيد; 1874 – 19 March 1927) was the sixth Sultan of Zanzibar. The last sovereign Sultan of Zanzibar, he reigned for roughly three days, after which he was deposed by the United Kingdom in the 38-minute Anglo-Zanzibar War.

== Biography ==
Sayyid Khalid bin Barghash Al-Busa'id was born in 1874 in Zanzibar, the second son of Barghash bin Said (Arabic: برغش بن سعيد البوسعيد), the second Sultan of Zanzibar.

=== First disputed accession of the Sultan of Zanzibar ===
He was 16 years old when, on 13 February 1890 the reigning Sultan Sayyid Khalifa bin Said Al-Busa'id (Arabic: خليفة بن سعيد البوسعيد), the successor to Bargash bin Said, died after a short reign of two years. He was succeeded by Sayyid Ali bin Said Al-Busa'id (Arabic: علي بن سعيد البوسعيد). Soon after, in July 1890, with the Heligoland–Zanzibar Treaty (German: Helgoland-Sansibar-Vertrag) between the German Empire and the United Kingdom, Germany agreed to "recognize the British protectorate over ... the islands of Zanzibar and Pemba" and the Sultan was forced to accede to the new power on the island. During his reign, a civil list had been drawn up reducing his income, and various departments, including the police force, had been created by the then British Consul Gerald Portal, each department under a European.

When Khalid bin Barghash was 19 years old, Rennell Rodd arrived in Zanzibar, in the New Year of 1893, to replace Gerald Portal. Immediately, the succession of the ailing Sultan was discussed and three candidates emerged. "There was Khaled, son of Barghash, a rather truculent youth of eighteen: there was Hamed Bin Thwain, the son of a brother of Barghash now dead, a man of about forty, of reputed high character and a student of Arab literature: and finally there was Mahmoud, an elder cousin of the reigning Sultan." Khalid bin Barghash, despite his very strong claims to the throne as the son of Bargash, in Rennell Rodd's view "was, however, for other reasons undesirable."

During Rennell Rodd's last visit to the Sultan, when he presented Cecil Rhodes at his court in March 1893, it was obvious to him that the Sultan had not long to live. Accordingly, he made preparations for daily and nightly signals to be exchanged with HMS Philomel and HMS Blanche where marines were to be at the ready with machine guns. On the night of March 5th 1893, Sayyid Ali bin Said Al-Busa'id died as anticipated. Khalid entered the palace let in by his aunt, the Sultan's sister, Bi. Zemzem binti Sa'id bin Sultan, who was fond of Khalid. However, Rennell Rodd immediately ordered the landings of 200 marines armed with machine guns, while the police force under Lieutenant Hatch was stationed around the palace and town. Refused permission to enter the palace, an ultimatum was issued with the threat that the doors of the palace would be blown open within five minutes if entry was barred. After entry was forced into the palace, Khalid was rebuked and marched off to his house under arrest, and the Sayyid Hamad bin Thuwaini Al-Busa'id (Arabic: حمد بن ثويني البوسعيد) was installed as the new Sultan, after he had accepted the conditions "which had been carefully thought out and prepared in advance" by Rennell Rodd.

=== Second disputed accession of the Sultan of Zanzibar ===
The events of 1893 were in some measure repeated in 1896 but on a much larger scale. Khalid briefly ruled Zanzibar (25–27 August 1896), seizing power after the sudden death of his cousin Hamad bin Thuwaini, who many suspect was poisoned by Khalid. Great Britain refused to recognise his claim to the throne, citing a treaty from 1866 which stated that a new sultan could only accede to the throne with British assent, resulting in the Anglo-Zanzibar War, the briefest war in history. During the "war", Royal Navy vessels shelled Khalid's palace for 38 minutes before a surrender was received. This time, the casualties sustained were 500 or so men in Khalid's retinue, martial law was imposed, and several Omani sheikhs suspected of complicity were apprehended and deported to Machakos. Khalid fled his palace through a back door to take refuge in the German consulate.

Basil Cave, the British Consul, who had been Vice-Consul when Rennell Rodd had removed Khalid from succession three years earlier, informed the Foreign Secretary, Marquess of Salisbury, in September, that he "remains in the house all the doors of which are guarded, from the inside, by about ten armed sailors or marines from a German man-of-war in harbour. The Consulate is being carefully and constantly watched by men in the service of Sir Lloyd Mathews".

In October 1896, Albrecht von Rechenberg, the German Consul in Zanzibar, wrote to Cave saying, "Monsieur le Gerant, J'ai l'honneur de vous informer que mon Gouvemement m'a ordonne d'envoyer Chalid bin Bargash á Dar-es-Salaam. Le transport sera effectue sans que Chalid touche le sol de Zanzibar". ('To the Principal Officer: I beg to inform you that my Government has requested me to send Chalid bin Bargash to Dar es Salaam. The transportation will be carried out without Chalid setting foot on the soil of Zanzibar').

=== First exile ===
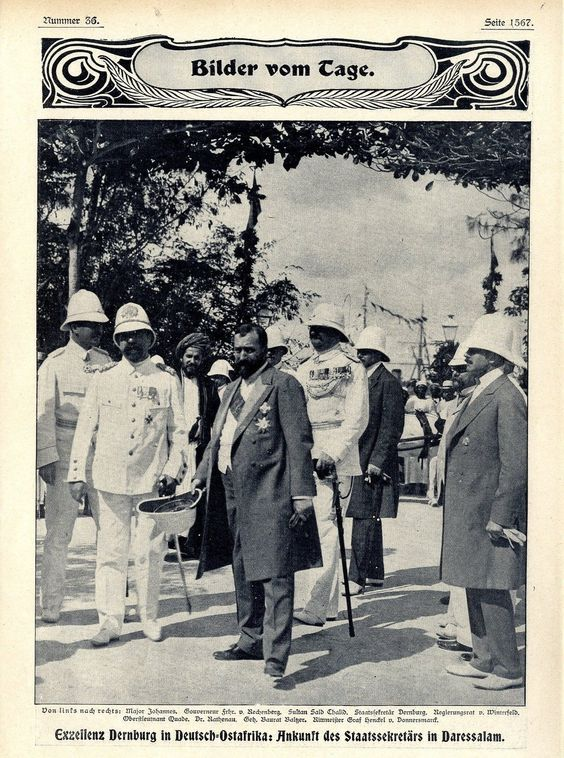
Governor Rechenberg, Dernberg, Sultan Khalid and others in Dar es Salaam 1907

Events transpired as Rechenberg had outlined, and Khalid was conveyed by SMS Seeadler, a ship anchored outside the Imperial Consulate, safely to Dar es Salaam without Khalid stepping on Zanzibari soil. In German East Africa, he received political asylum. In the following years in Dar es Salaam, he enjoyed the rank and privileges customarily conferred on royal persons in exile, and was present on many occasions of importance to the government, such as the state visit of Bernard Dernberg, the newly appointed German Colonial Secretary.

According to one source, "Huko Dar es Salaam Sayyid Khalid aliwekwa katika nyumba ya fakhari na vilevile aliachiwa kupandisha bendera nyekundu ya usultani wa Zanzibar." ("Over in Dar-es-Salaam Sayyid Khalid was set up in a grand house and at the same time was permitted to fly the red flag of the Sultanate of Zanzibar").

=== Second exile ===
During the First World War, he was captured by British forces, arguably in Dar es Salaam in 1917, but possibly elsewhere, and was exiled to Saint Helena, the island where Napoleon had been previously exiled, and later to the Seychelles. After many entreaties asking for his return to East Africa, Winston Churchill, as Secretary of State to the Colonies, wrote to the Administrator of Seychelles (22 March 1922): "It has been arranged that Seyyid Khaled bin Bargash and his dependents should in future be allowed to reside at Mombasa." Khalid died in Mombasa on Saturday, 19 March 1927, five years after his return there.

Throughout his exile in the Seychelles he was denied access to his extensive property around Mombasa and the revenues from it.

== Legacy ==
He had at least five sons and one daughter. Permission was eventually granted to them to return to Zanzibar, but their only property remaining was in Dar es Salaam. One of the sons, Majid (Arabic: مجد) was mentioned as having helped Frederick Johnson compile his Standard Swahili–English Dictionary.

Preceded by Hamad bin Thuwaini	Sultan of Zanzibar; 1896	Succeeded by Hamoud bin Mohammed
