= Hamoud bin Mohammed of Zanzibar =

Omani sultan of Zanzibar (1853–1902)

Sir Hamoud bin Mohammed حمود بن محمد (Arabic)
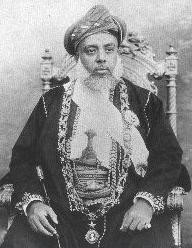
- Formal portrait, c. 1896–1902

Sultan of Zanzibar
- Reign: 27 August 1896 - 18 July 1902
- Predecessor: Khalid bin Barghash
- Successor: Ali bin Hamud
- Born: c. 1853
- Died: 18 July 1902 (aged 48–49)
- Issue: Ali II bin Hamoud
- House: Al Bu Said
- Father: Sayyid Mohammed bin Said

Sayyid Hamoud bin Mohammed Al-Busaidi, GCSI (Arabic: حمود بن محمد البوسعيد; c. 1853 – 18 July 1902), was the seventh Sultan of Zanzibar.

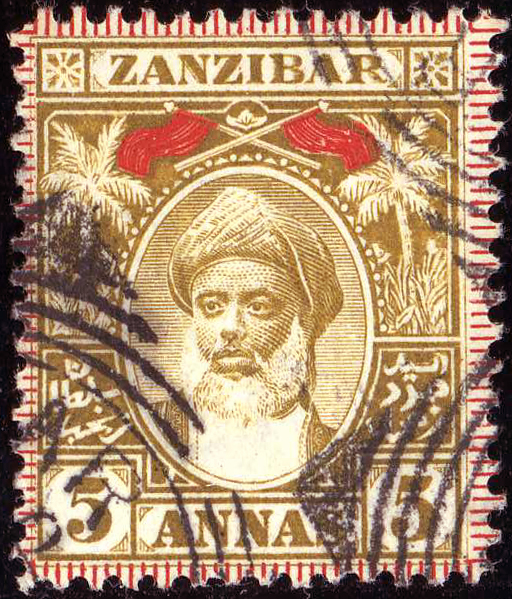
Portrait on a Zanzibar 1899 stamp

== Biography ==
Hamoud became sultan with the support of the British consul, Sir Basil Cave, upon the death of Sayyid Hamad bin Thuwaini. Before he could enter the palace, another potential contender for the throne, Sayyid Khalid bin Barghash, seized the palace and declared himself sultan. The British responded the next day, 26 August 1896, by issuing an ultimatum to Khalid and his entourage to evacuate the palace by 9:00 am on 27 August. When he refused, Royal Navy warships fired on the palace and other strategic locations in the city, causing Khalid and his group to flee. According to the Guinness Book of World Records, the resultant Anglo-Zanzibar War was the shortest war in history, and the same day Hamoud was able to assume the title of sultan, more indebted to the British than ever.

Hamoud demanded that slavery be abolished in Zanzibar and that all the slaves be manumitted except in the case of concubines (manumitted in 1909.).

On his death in 1902, he was succeeded by his oldest son, Sayyid Ali bin Hamud.

== Legacy ==
With his wife, Sayyida Khanfora bint Majid Al-Busaid (daughter of the first Sultan of Zanzibar), he had ten children:

- Sayyid Ali bin Hamud Al-Busaid, 8th Sultan of Zanzibar
- Sayyid Majid bin Hamud Al-Busaid
- Sayyid Saud bin Hamud Al-Busaid
- Sayyid Taimur bin Hamud Al-Busaid
- Sayyid Faisal bin Hamud Al-Busaid
- Sayyid Muhammed bin Hamud Al-Busaid
- Sayyida Matuka bint Hamud Al-Busaid (who married Sayyid Khalifa bin Harub Al-Busaid, 9th Sultan of Zanzibar)
- Sayyida Boran bint Hamud Al-Busaid (who married Sayyid Said bin Ali, the son of the fourth Sultan of Zanzibar)
- Sayyida Mishan bint Hamud Al-Busaid (twin with Boran)
- Sayyida Hakima bint Hamud Al-Busaid

== Honours ==
- Knight Grand Commander of the Order of the Star of India (GCSI) – 1894

Preceded by Khalid bin Barghash	Sultan of Zanzibar; 1896–1902	Succeeded by Ali bin Hamud
