= List of sultans of Zanzibar =

Sultan of Zanzibar
- Sultanate flag

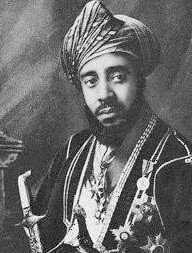
- Longest serving ruler: Khalifa bin Harub; 9 December 1911 – 9 October 1960

Details
- First monarch: Majid bin Said
- Last monarch: Jamshid bin Abdullah
- Formed: 1856
- Abolished: 1964
- Residences: Sultan's Palace, Stone Town
- Appointer: Hereditary
- Pretender: Crown Prince Sayyid Ali bin Jamshid Al Said (since 2024)

The Sultan of Zanzibar (Arabic: سلاطين زنجبار; Swahili: Sultani wa Zanzibar) was the ruler of the Sultanate of Zanzibar, which was created on 19 October 1856 after the death of Said bin Sultan, who had ruled Oman and Zanzibar as the sultan of Oman since 1804. The sultans of Zanzibar were of a cadet branch of the Al Bu Said dynasty of Oman.

In 1698, Zanzibar became part of the overseas holdings of Oman, falling under the control of the sultan of Oman. Omani and other Arab traders had already been prominent in trade with the island for hundreds of years. It was also visited by traders from Persia and India, who arrived with the seasonal musim (west wind). Months later they could return east with a change in the wind.

In 1832 or 1840 (the date varies among sources), Said bin Sultan moved his capital from Muscat in Oman to Stone Town on Zanzibar. He established a ruling Arab elite and encouraged the development of clove plantations, using the island's enslaved black Africans as labourers.

Zanzibar's commerce fell increasingly into the hands of traders from the Indian subcontinent, whom Said encouraged to settle on the island. Traders had been coming to the island from Persia, Arabia, and India for hundreds of years. After Said's death in 1856, two of his sons, Majid bin Said and Thuwaini bin Said, struggled over the succession. They divided Zanzibar and Oman into two separate principalities; Thuwaini became the sultan of Oman, and Majid became the first sultan of Zanzibar.

During his 14-year reign as sultan, Majid consolidated his power around the East African slave trade. His successor, Barghash bin Said, helped abolish the slave trade in Zanzibar and is credited with developing the country's infrastructure. The third sultan, Khalifa bin Said, also furthered the country's progress toward abolishing slavery.

Until 1886, the sultan of Zanzibar also controlled a substantial portion of the east African coast, known as Zanj, and trade routes that extended further into the continent, as far as Kindu on the Congo River. That year, the British and Germans secretly met and re-established the area under the sultan's rule.

Over the next few years, European imperial powers took over most of the mainland possessions of the Sultanate. With the signing of the Heligoland–Zanzibar Treaty in 1890 during Ali bin Said's reign, Zanzibar became a British protectorate. In August 1896, Britain and Zanzibar fought a 38-minute war, the shortest in recorded history, after Khalid bin Barghash had taken power following Hamid bin Thuwaini's death.

The British had wanted Hamoud bin Mohammed to become sultan, believing that he would be much easier to work with. The British gave Khalid an hour to vacate the sultan's palace in Stone Town. Khalid failed to do so, and instead assembled an army of 2,800 men to fight the British. The British launched an attack on the palace and other locations around the city. Khalid retreated and later went into exile. The British installed Hamoud as sultan.

Khalifa bin Harub became Sultan of Zanzibar in late 1911; he reigned until his death in October 1960.

In December 1963, Zanzibar was granted independence by the United Kingdom and became a constitutional monarchy within the Commonwealth under the sultan. Sultan Jamshid bin Abdullah was overthrown a month later during the Zanzibar Revolution. Jamshid fled into exile, and the Sultanate was replaced by the People's Republic of Zanzibar and Pemba, a government dominated by Africans.

In April 1964, the republic was united with Tanganyika to form the United Republic of Tanganyika and Zanzibar. This was renamed as Tanzania six months later.

== Sultans of Zanzibar ==
No.	Sultan	Full name	Portrait	Began rule	Ended rule	Rule duration	Notes
1	Majid bin Said^{[A]}	Sayyid Majid bin Said Al-Busaid	A black-and-white photograph of a man with a dark beard wearing a turban and robes, sitting on a patterned chair, and looking at the viewer	19 October 1856	7 October 1870	13 years, 347 days	Bargash bin Said attempted to usurp the throne from his brother in 1859, but failed. He was exiled to Bombay for two years.
2	Barghash bin Said	Sayyid Sir Barghash bin Said Al-Busaid	A black-and-white photograph of a man with a dark beard wearing a turban, a dark jacket, a shirt, and a belt, sitting in a chair, and looking at the viewer	7 October 1870	26 March 1888	17 years, 148 days	Responsible for developing much of the infrastructure in Zanzibar (especially Stone Town), like piped water, telegraph cables, buildings, roads, etc. Helped abolish the Zanzibar slave trade by signing an agreement with Britain in 1870, prohibiting slave trade in the sultanate, and closing the slave market in Mkunazini.
3	Khalifa bin Said	Sayyid Sir Khalifa I bin Said Al-Busaid	A black-and-white sketch of a man with a dark beard wearing glasses, a turban, a dark jacket, and a white shirt all in front of a white background	26 March 1888	13 February 1890	1 year, 352 days	Supported abolitionism, like his predecessor.
4	Ali bin Said	Sayyid Sir Ali bin Said Al-Busaid	A black-and-white photograph of a man with a dark beard wearing a turban, a dark jacket, and a white shirt, sitting, and looking at the viewer	13 February 1890	5 March 1893	3 years, 20 days	The British and German Empires signed the Heligoland-Zanzibar Treaty in July 1890. This treaty turned Zanzibar into a British protectorate.^{[B]}
5	Hamid bin Thuwayni	Sayyid Sir Hamad bin Thuwaini Al-Busaid	A black-and-white photograph of a man with a dark beard wearing a turban, a dark jacket, and a white shirt, sitting, and looking at the viewer	5 March 1893	25 August 1896	3 years, 173 days	
6	Khalid bin Barghash	Sayyid Khalid bin Barghash Al-Busaid	A black-and-white sketch of a man with a dark beard wearing a turban, a dark jacket, and a white shirt and looking to the right of the viewer	25 August 1896	27 August 1896^{[C]}	2 days	Was a belligerent in the Anglo-Zanzibar War, the shortest war in recorded history.
7	Hamoud bin Mohammed	Sayyid Sir Hamoud bin Mohammed Al-Busaid	A black-and-white photograph of a man with a white beard wearing a turban, a dark jacket, a white shirt, and a belt and sitting on a chair	27 August 1896	18 July 1902	5 years, 325 days	Issued the final decree abolishing slavery in Zanzibar on 6 April 1897. For this, he was knighted by Queen Victoria.
8	Ali bin Hamud	Sayyid Ali bin Hamud Al-Busaid	A black-and-white photograph of a man with a dark moustache wearing a turban and a dark jacket and sitting on a throne topped by two metal lions	20 July 1902	9 December 1911^{[D]}	9 years, 144 days	The British First Minister, Mr A. Rogers, served as regent until Ali reached the age of 21 on 7 June 1905.
9	Khalifa bin Harub	Sayyid Sir Khalifa II bin Harub Al-Busaid	A black-and-white photograph of a man with a dark beard wearing a turban, a dark jacket, a white shirt, and several medals and looking to the right of the viewer	9 December 1911	9 October 1960	48 years, 305 days	Brother-in-law of Ali bin Hamud. Oversaw the construction of harbor in Stone Town and tar roads in Pemba.
10	Abdullah bin Khalifa	Sayyid Sir Abdullah bin Khalifa Al-Busaid		9 October 1960	1 July 1963^{[E]}	2 years, 265 days	
11	Jamshid bin Abdullah	Sayyid Sir Jamshid bin Abdullah Al-Busaid		1 July 1963	12 January 1964^{[F]}	195 days	On 10 December 1963, Zanzibar received its independence from the United Kingdom as a constitutional monarchy within the Commonwealth under Jamshid.

== Family tree ==
- Sayyid Said, Sultan of Muscat, Oman and Zanzibar (1797–1856)
  - Sayyid Thuwaini, Sultan of Muscat and Oman (1821–1866)
    - Sayyid Harub (1849–1907)
      - IX. Sayyid Khalifa II (26 August 1879 – 9 October 1960; r. 9 December 1911 – 9 October 1960) 9 Al-Said
        - X. Sayyid Abdullah (13 February 1911 – 1 July 1963; r. 9 October 1960 – 1 July 1963) 10 Al-Said
          - XI. Sayyid Jamshid (16 September 1929 – 30 December 2024; r. 1 July 1963 – 17 January 1964; Head of the Zanzibari royal house: 17 January 1964 – 30 December 2024) 11 Al-Said
    - V. Sayyid Hamad (1857 – 25 August 1896; r. 5 March 1893 – 25 August 1896) 5 Al-Busaid
  - Sayyid Muhammad (1826–1863)
    - VII. Sayyid Hamud (1853 – 18 July 1902; r. 27 August 1896 – 18 July 1902) 7 Al-Said
      - VIII. Sayyid Ali II (7 June 1884 – 20 December 1918; r. 18 July 1902 – 9 December 1911) 8 Al-Busaid
  - I. Sayyid Majid (1834 – 7 October 1870; r. 19 October 1856 – 7 October 1870) 1 Al-Busaid
  - II. Sayyid Barghash (1837 – 26 March 1888; r. 7 October 1870 – 26 March 1888) 2 Al-Busaid
    - VI. Sayyid Khalid (15 December 1874 – 19 March 1927; r. 25–27 August 1896) 6 Al-Busaid
  - III. Sayyid Khalifa I (1852 – 13 February 1890; r. 26 March 1888 – 13 February 1890) 3 Al-Busaid
  - IV. Sayyid Ali I (September 1854 – 5 March 1893; r. 13 February 1890 – 5 March 1893) 4 Al-Busaid

House of Busaid

Said bin Sultan; Oman r. 1804–1856
Majid bin Said^{(1)} r. 1856–1870	Barghash bin Said^{(2)} r. 1870–1888	Khalifah bin Said^{(3)} r. 1888–1890	Ali bin Said^{(4)} r. 1890–1893	Mohammed bin Said	Thuwaini bin Said; Oman r. 1856–1866
Khalid bin Barghash^{(6)} r. 1896	Hamud bin Mohammed^{(7)} r. 1896–1902	Harub bin Thuwaini	Hamad bin Thuwaini^{(5)} r. 1893–1896
Ali bin Hamud^{(8)} r. 1902–1911	Matuka bint Hamud	Khalifa bin Harub^{(9)} r. 1911–1960
Tohfa bint Ali	Abdullah bin Khalifa^{(10)} r. 1960–1963
Jamshid bin Abdullah^{(11)} r. 1963–1964

== See also ==
- Tanzania
  - Politics of Tanzania
  - List of governors of Tanganyika
  - President of Tanzania
    - List of heads of state of Tanzania
  - Prime Minister of Tanzania
    - List of prime ministers of Tanzania
  - President of Zanzibar
  - List of heads of government of Zanzibar
  - List of rulers of Oman

== Footnotes ==
- ^{A} Majid bin Said, the youngest son of Said bin Sultan, became the Sultan of Oman after his father's death on 19 October 1856. However, Majid's elder brother, Thuwaini bin Said, contested the accession to power. Following a struggle over the position, it was decided that Zanzibar and Oman would be divided into two separate principalities. Majid would rule as the Sultan of Zanzibar while Thuwaini would rule as the Sultan of Oman.
- ^{B} From 1886, the United Kingdom and Germany had plotted to obtain parts of the Zanzibar Sultanate for their own empires. In October 1886, a German-British border commission established the Zanj as a 10 nautical mile (19 km) wide strip along most of the coast of East Africa, stretching from Cape Delgado (now in Mozambique) to Kipini (now in Kenya), including Mombasa and Dar es Salaam. Over the next few years, almost all of these mainland possessions were lost to European imperial powers.
- ^{C} Hamoud bin Mohammed, the son-in-law of Majid bin Said, was supposed to become the Sultan of Zanzibar after Hamid bin Thuwayni's death. However, Khalid bin Bhargash, son of Bargash bin Said, seized the Sultan's palace and declared himself the ruler of Zanzibar. The British, who had supported Hamoud, responded on 26 August by issuing an ultimatum to Khalid and his men to leave the palace within one hour. After he refused, the Royal Navy began firing at the palace and other locations in Stone Town. Khalid assembled an army of 2,800 and stationed them all around the town. Thirty-eight minutes later, Khalid retreated to the German consulate, where he was granted asylum. This conflict, known as the Anglo-Zanzibar War, was the shortest war in recorded history. Khalid later went into exile in Dar es Salaam until being captured by the British in 1916.
- ^{D} After attending the coronation of King George V, Ali decided to abdicate from the throne to live in Europe.
- ^{E} Abdullah bin Khalifah died from complications of diabetes.
- ^{F} Jamshid bin Abdullah overthrown on 12 January 1964 during the Zanzibar Revolution. Jamshid managed to flee to Great Britain with his family and ministers.
