= Majid bin Said =

Majid bin Said ماجد بن سعيد (Arabic)
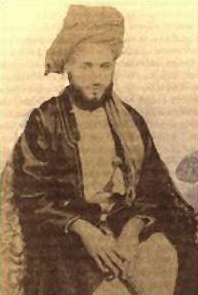
- Photograph of Sultan Majid (probably 1860s)

Sultan of Zanzibar
- Reign: 19 October 1856 – 7 October 1870
- Predecessor: Said bin Sultan (as Sultan of the Omani Empire)
- Successor: Barghash bin Said
- Born: c. 1834; Unguja
- Died: 7 October 1870 (aged 35–36); Zanzibar (Unguja)
- Burial: Makusurani Cemetery
- Consort: Sayyida Aisha Al-Said
- Issue: Sayyida Khanfora bint Majid Al-Said
Names
- Sayyid Majid bin Said Al-Busaid
- House: Al Bu Said
- Father: Said bin Sultan
- Mother: Sarah
- Religion: Ibadi Islam

Sayyid Majid bin Saïd al-Busaidi (Arabic: ماجد بن سعيد البوسعيد) (c. 1834 – 7 October 1870) was the first Sultan of Zanzibar. He ruled Zanzibar from 19 October 1856 to 7 October 1870.

He succeeded his father Said bin Sultan as ruler of Zanzibar and East Africa, and briefly (claimed) Oman following Said’s death. During his reign his brother Bargash would prove constantly rebellious and adhered to his rule, nonetheless, Majid remained in power until his untimely death which was due to ‘over indulgence in sensual pleasures and stimulants’. The region’s wealth soared, particularly with the controversial Zanzibar slave trade.

== Life ==
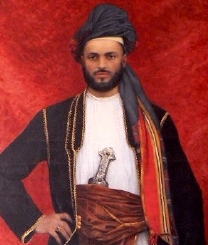
Portrait of Sultan Majid

Sayyid Majid bin Said was born in 1834 in Zanzibar to Said bin Sultan and Sarah, a Circassian suri. Majid was the second eldest of Said’s children born in Zanzibar, after Khalid bin Said (died 1854).

Majid became Sultan of the Omani Empire, based at the capital at Zanzibar, following the death of his father, Sayyid Said bin Sultan, but his accession was contested. Following the struggle over the accession to the position of Sultan of Oman, Zanzibar and Oman were divided into two separate sultanates, with Majid ruling Zanzibar and his older brother Thuwaini ruling Oman.

His marriage produced only one daughter, Sayyida Khanfora bint Majid (who married her cousin, Hamoud bin Mohammed). Consequently, Majid was succeeded as Sultan by his brother Barghash. Majid's grandson Ali bin Hamud Al-Busaid later became the 8th Sultan of Zanzibar, while his great-grandson Abdullah bin Khalifa Al-Said was the 10th Sultan.

In 1866, he purchased the former Confederate commerce raider CSS Shenandoah and renamed her El Majidi after himself.

In 1871, botanists published a genus of flowering plants belonging to the family Sapindaceae, from Central Africa and called it Majidea in his honour.

== Sources ==
- Keane, Augustus H. (1907), Africa, vol. 1 (2nd ed.), London: Edward Stanford, OCLC 6646364

Preceded by Said bin Sultan (as Sultan of Muscat and Oman)	Sultan of Zanzibar; 1856–1870	Succeeded by Barghash bin Said
