= Khalifah bin Said =

Third Sultan of Zanzibar

Khalifah bin Said خليفة بن سعيد البوسعيد (Arabic)
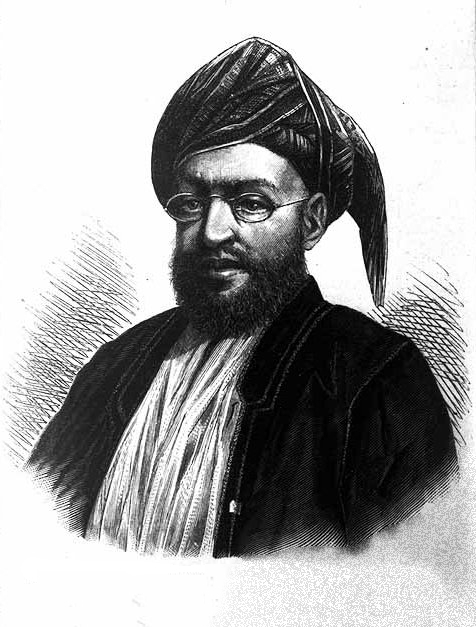

Sultan of Zanzibar
- Reign: March 26th 1888 - February 13th 1890
- Predecessor: Barghash bin Said
- Successor: Ali bin Said
- Born: c. 1852
- Died: 13 February 1890 (aged 37–38)
- Dynasty: Al Bu Said
- Father: Said bin Sultan

Sayyid Khalifa I bin Said al-Busaidi, GCMG, (or Chalîfe) (c. 1852 – 13 February 1890) (Arabic: خليفة بن سعيد البوسعيد) was the third Sultan of Zanzibar. He ruled Zanzibar from 26 March 1888 to 13 February 1890 and was succeeded by his brother, Ali bin Said.

== Life ==
In 1870 his elder brother and predecessor Barghash bin Said had him imprisoned for the (alleged) entanglement in a coup attempt. According to their sister Emily Ruete, Barghash did not release Khalifah before one of their sisters prepared to set out for a pilgrimage for Mecca, and "he did not want to bring down upon himself a curse pronounced in the Holy City of the Prophet. But his sister did not pardon him before he had set free the innocent Chalîfe."

Emily Ruete wrote in 1886:

It is a well-known fact in Zanzibar that Barghash, as soon as he had ascended the throne in 1870, suddenly and without any cause cast our second youngest brother Chalîfe into prison. The poor fellow had to languish there for three long years in the dungeon, in heavy iron fetters weighed with chains! And why? No one could say. It may have been feared that Chalîfe, being next in succession to the throne, might plot the same treacherous plans as Barghash himself had once tried against Madjid.

According to Ruete, Barghash continued to spy on Khalifah and his friends. She notes one instance where Barghash apparently willfully ruined a wealthy chief and friend of Khalifah, so that Khalifah would be deprived of support from rich chiefs. He became Sultan upon the sudden death of his brother during the protracted negotiations with the German East Africa Company. Unlike his brother, he gave in to lease the Tanganyika coast of mainland East Africa to the Germans, which immediately led to the Abushiri Revolt.

While his predecessor Barghash signed the treaty abolishing the slave trade under British pressure, Khalifah was forced to issue a specific decree within days of his accession (March 1888) declaring all slaves entering Zanzibar automatically free. This immediate action, demanded by the British Consul to close perceived loopholes, underscored his lack of political autonomy from the outset of his reign.

Sayyid Khalifa I was appointed an Honorary Knight Grand Cross of the United Kingdom's Most Distinguished Order of Saint Michael and Saint George on 18 December 1889.

== Honours ==
- Knight Grand Cross of the Order of St Michael and St George (GCMG)-1888

== Footnotes ==
Preceded by Barghash bin Said	Sultan of Zanzibar; 1888–1890	Succeeded by Ali bin Said
