= Ali bin Hamud of Zanzibar =

Sultan of Zanzibar

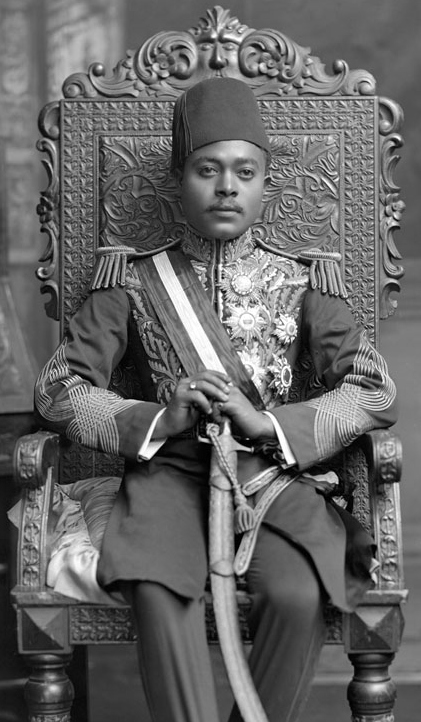
- Ali II, c. 1902–1911

Sultan of Zanzibar
- Reign: 20 July 1902 – 9 December 1911
- Predecessor: Hamoud bin Mohammed Al-Said
- Successor: Sir Khalifa bin Harub Al-Said
- Born: 7 June 1884; Zanzibar Sultanate
- Died: 20 December 1918 (aged 34); Paris, France
- Spouse: Chukwani bint Faisal ibn Turki Al-Busaid (Note: sometimes styled as a daughter of Sultan Faisal ibn Turki of Oman)
- Issue: Sayyid Saud bin ‘Ali Al-Busaid; Sayyid Farid bin ‘Ali Al-Busaid; Sayyida Zeana bint ‘Ali; Sayyida Tohfa bint ‘Ali
- Sayyid Ali bin Hamud al-Busaidi
- House: Al Bu Said
- Father: Hamoud bin Mohammed Al-Said
- Religion: Ibadi Islam

Sayyid Ali bin Hamud al-Busaidi (7 June 1884 – 20 December 1918; Arabic: علي بن حمود البوسعيد), also known as Ali II, was the eighth Sultan of Zanzibar from 1902 to 1911.

== Biography ==
Hamud was proclaimed Sultan of Zanzibar on 20 July 1902, following the death of his father, the seventh Sultan, two days earlier. There was a regency until he attained majority.

He married Chukwani bint Faisal ibn Turki Al-Busaid (sometimes styled as a daughter of Sultan Faisal ibn Turki of Oman) at Chukwani Palace, Zanzibar in 1902.

He served only a few years as sultan because of illness. On 9 December 1911 he abdicated in favour of his brother-in-law Khalifa bin Harub Al-Busaid.

During his reign, slavery in Zanzibar was fully abolished with the abolition of concubinage in 1909.

Ali II abdicated the throne in December 1911 due to ill health and later lived in Europe until his death in 1918 in Paris. His children continued to have roles or connections within the broader Al-Busaid/Al-Sa’id dynastic network in Zanzibar and Oman.

== Notes ==
Preceded by Hamud bin Muhammad	Sultan of Zanzibar; 1902–1911	Succeeded by Khalifa bin Harub
