= Hamad bin Thuwaini of Zanzibar =

Hamad bin Thuwaini حمد بن ثويني (Arabic)
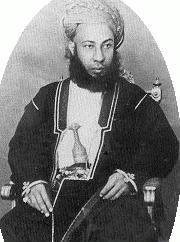
- Sultan Hamad c. 1893–96

Sultan of Zanzibar
- Reign: 5 March 1893 – 25 August 1896
- Predecessor: Ali bin Said
- Successor: Khalid bin Barghash
- Born: c. 1857; Zanzibar?
- Died: 25 August 1896 (aged 38–39); Zanzibar
- Consort: Sayyida Turkia bint Turki Al-Said
Names
- Sayyid Hamad bin Thuwaini Al-Busaid
- House: Al Said
- Father: Thuwaini bin Said
- Religion: Ibadi Islam

Sayyid Hamad bin Thuwaini Al-Busaidi (Arabic: حمد بن ثويني البوسعيدي; c. 1857 – 25 August 1896) was the fifth Sultan of Zanzibar. He ruled Zanzibar from 5 March 1893 to 25 August 1896.

== Life ==
Hamad bin Thuwaini Al-Busaid was born in 1857, probably in Zanzibar, as a son of Sultan Thuwaini bin Said.

He was married to his cousin, Sayyida Turkia bint Turki Al-Said, daughter of Turki bin Said, Sultan of Muscat and Oman. Hamad died suddenly at 11:40 AM on 25 August 1896 and was possibly poisoned by his cousin Khalid bin Barghash who proclaimed himself the new Sultan and held the position for three days before being replaced by the British Armed Forces after the Anglo-Zanzibar War.

== Foreign honours ==
- Italy: Grand Cross of the Order of the Crown of Italy (1893)
- Great Britain: Knight Grand Commander of the Order of the Star of India (1894)
- Germany: Grand Cross of the Order of the Red Eagle, 1st Class (1895)

== Citations ==
Preceded by Ali bin Said	Sultan of Zanzibar; 1893–1896	Succeeded by Khalid bin Barghash
