= Ali bin Said of Zanzibar =

Fourth Sultan of Zanzibar 1890-1893

Ali bin Said علي بن سعيد البوسعيد (Arabic)
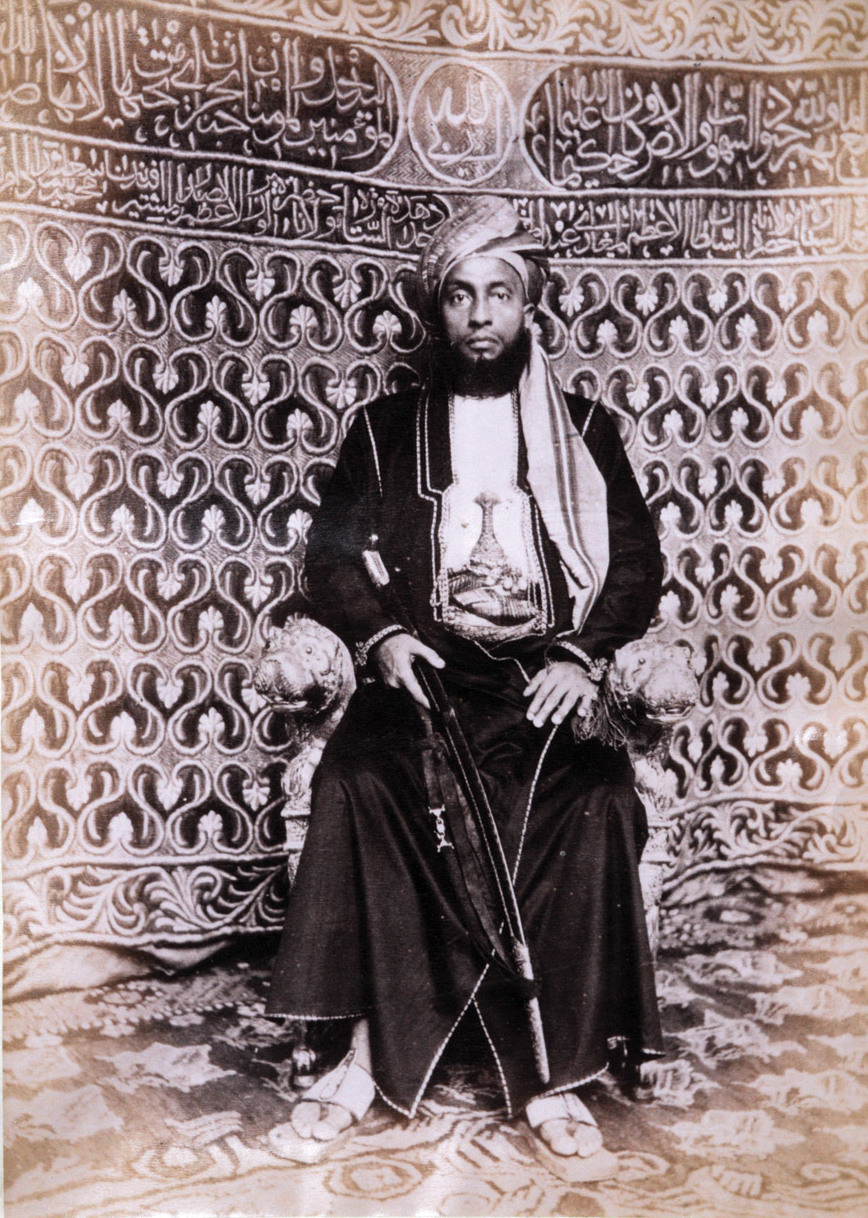

Sultan of Zanzibar
- Reign: 13 February 1890 – 5 March 1893
- Predecessor: Khalifah bin Said
- Successor: Hamad bin Thuwaini
- Born: c. 1854
- Died: 5 March 1893 (aged 38–39)
- Dynasty: Al Bu Said
- Father: Said bin Sultan

Sayyid Ali bin Said al-Busaidi, GCSI, (c. 1854 – March 5, 1893) (Arabic: علي بن سعيد البوسعيد) was the fourth Sultan of Zanzibar. He ruled Zanzibar from February 13, 1890, to March 5, 1893. In June 1890 he was forced to accept a British protectorate over his dominions.

He was succeeded by his nephew, Hamad bin Thuwaini Al-Busaid.

== Honours ==
- Knight Grand Commander of the Order of the Star of India (GCSI)-1890

Preceded by Khalifah bin Said	Sultan of Zanzibar; 1890–1893	Succeeded by Hamad bin Thuwaini
