= Atkins Hamerton =

Irish-born British soldier and diplomat

- Born: 1804; Donnycarney, County Dublin, Ireland
- Died: 1857 (aged 52–53); Zanzibar
- Military career
- Allegiance: United Kingdom
- Branch: British Indian Army
- Rank: Captain (Note: Hamerton is also styled Lieutenant-Colonel Hamerton and Major Hamerton in the literature, referring to the same period in Zanzibar.)

Atkins Hamerton (1804 – 5 July 1857) was a British soldier and diplomat who served as British consul in Zanzibar from 1841 to 1857. He is known for his role in the initially unsuccessful British attempt to end the Arab slave trade between Zanzibar and the Persian Gulf region.

== Childhood and education ==
Hamerton was born in Donnycarney, County Dublin, Ireland in 1804, the son of Edward Hamerton, clerk of ships' entries in Dublin, and his wife. He was educated at St Thomas's Church, Dublin, by the curate-assistant, the Rev. John Fea.

== Army career ==
In 1837, Hamerton attained the rank of captain serving in the 15th Regiment Bombay Native Infantry of the British Indian Army, having arrived in Bombay in 1825 and risen through the ranks. In 1840, he was tasked with visiting the oasis city of Al-Buraimi in Oman to give his advice on strengthening its defences, being the first visitor from Europe to see the city and only the second to traverse the northern parts of Oman.

== Consul in Zanzibar ==
Hamerton was originally sent from Oman by the Honourable East India Company as their representative to Muscat, but the following year was sent to Zanzibar to supervise the Company's interests. The Company came to an agreement with the British Foreign Office that led to his also being given the role as first British consul, with instructions to spy on the French and report back on the slave trade to both London and the British Government in Bombay.

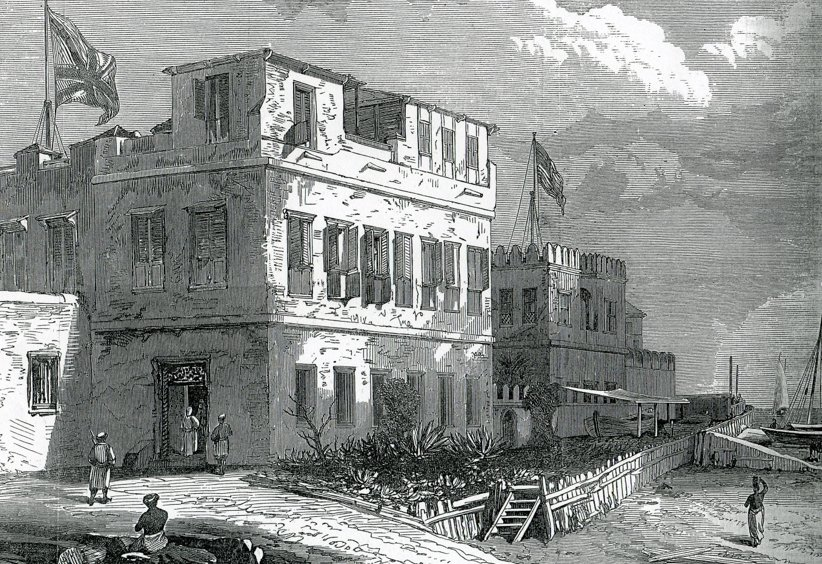
The British Agency, Zanzibar, 1872

Hamerton outstayed most Europeans in Zanzibar, where malaria and cholera were ever-present dangers and venereal disease endemic, eventually spending fifteen years on the island, where, according to Alan Moorehead, "to a large extent the social and political life of the island revolved around him".

Moorehead offers the following portrait of Hamerton:

It is extraordinary that in an atmosphere which was remarkable for quarrels and petty jealousies, so few of his contemporaries have a word to say against this warm-hearted and genial Irishman. Hamerton was the intimate friend and adviser of the Sultan Seyyid Said . . . he smoothed and calmed every crisis that beset the island and he wrote very sensible dispatches to his superiors in India and London. The British Consulate under Hamerton became the recognized point of rendezvous under the foreign community. "He kept the whole town alive," Speke wrote, and his hospitality and joviality was remarked upon by every visitor to the island.

=== Arab slave trade ===
Hamerton was a friend of Said bin Sultan, the last ruler of the Omani Empire, with the sultan giving Hamerton a building abutting the sea in the town centre as a residence, waiving the rent. The British were keen to exploit this friendship to end the slave trade in Zanzibar, which was flourishing at the time. Hamerton had written a dispatch to London in which he described the trade:

I fancy, in no part of the universe is the misery and human suffering these wretched slaves undergo, while being brought here and until they are sold, exceeded . . . They are in such a wretched state from starvation and disease, that they are sometimes considered not worth landing, and are allowed to expire in the boats to save a dollar a head duty, and the remains of these poor people are eaten on the beach by the dogs of the town; none will bury them.

Lord Palmerston, the foreign secretary, who was deeply opposed to the trade, wrote to Hamerton, saying, "The British Government is determined at all events to put this slave trade down, and is conscious it has the means of doing so. He told Hamerton he should inform Said bin Sultan that the trade should end forthwith. Zanzibar was within the purview of the East India Company, and the word of the British foreign secretary in London held less sway compared with that of the British Governor General in India. In the past, the Company had remained circumspect about the African slave trade and refused to do anything about it, much less be told what to do by London, but Palmerston's letter to Hamerton transformed the situation. Hamerton was therefore told when on leave in Bombay in 1843 that the Company wanted him to intervene with Said. This was more easily said than done, as Said responded to the promptings of Hamerton by reminding him that slavery was condoned by Islam: "The Koran, the word of God . . . sanctioned it, and the Arabs, of all Mahomedans, the people considered by the Almight as most deserving of favour, had a right to enslave infidels."

But Hamerton was a persuasive negotiator and the fruit of his work was a treaty signed by Said in 1845, known as the "Hamerton Treaty" – despite most of the work having been done by Lord Aberdeen and the Foreign Office – which outlawed the export of slaves from Zanzibar to the Persian Gulf area. It soon became apparent, however, that this was mere posturing by the sultan and the Company, the latter doing nothing to enforce the terms of the treaty, and Britain having few warships in the area. So the slave trade continued as before, with Hamerton reckoning that three-quarters of Zanzibar's population were slaves.

=== Burton and Speke ===
Both Richard Burton and John Hanning Speke stayed at Hamerton's house before they set off for the Great Lakes of Africa in search of the source of the Nile in 1856, with Hamerton doing much to help them. Hamerton got on famously with Burton, less so with the more tight-lipped Speke.

== Death ==
Hamerton died aged fifty-three of liver disease, although it has been said that "his disease was more than physical . . . The worst symptom in his case was his unwillingness to quit the place that was slowly killing him." (Burton noted that when they had met the previous year, Hamerton's hair had been "prematurely snow-white".) Moorehead relates his last days in The White Nile:

He was perfectly aware that his strength had finally run out; he confided to Burton that he expected death and welcomed it and wished to be buried at sea. On June 26, 1857, he sailed away, and he survived only a few days after his return to Zanzibar. Eleven months were to elapse before Burton and Speke were to hear in the depths of the interior that he was dead.

Seventeen years after Hamerton's death, the body of another explorer, David Livingstone, was taken to the former consul's residence on its passage back to Britain.

== Bibliography ==
- Hamerton, Atkins, Brief Notes, containing information on various points connected with his Highness the Imaum of Muskat; and the nature of his relations with the British Government &c, 1856, Bombay: Bombay Education Society's Press.
