= Trans-Saharan slave trade =

c. 650–1930 CE slave trade

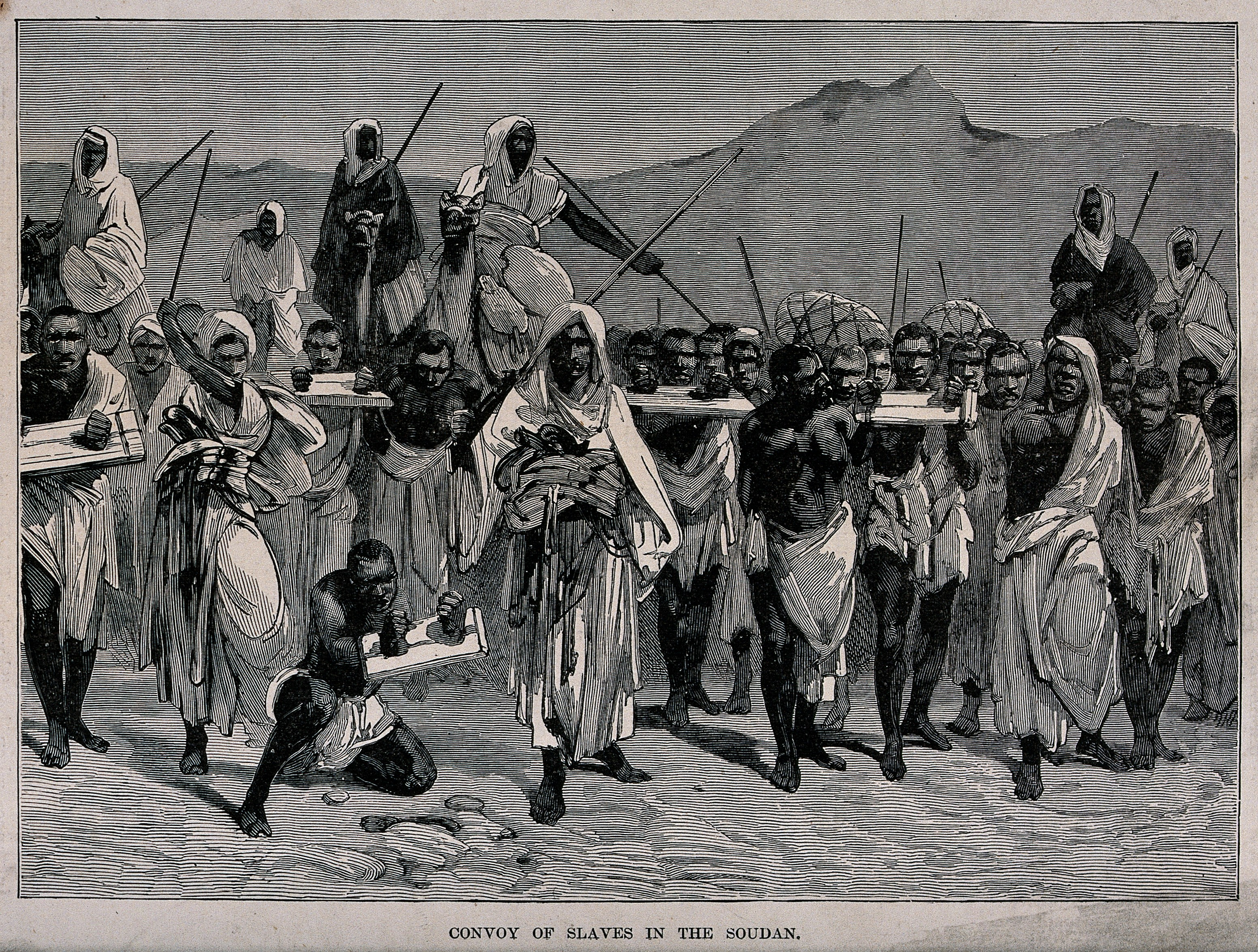
19th-century engraving depicting an Arab or Berber slave trading caravan transporting sub-Saharan African slaves across the Sahara to North Africa.

The trans-Saharan slave trade moved people across the Sahara, from the 3rd millennium BCE until the early-to-mid-20th century. Slaves, primarily from West, Central, and East Africa, were sold throughout the coastal Maghreb, Egypt, the Levant, the Arabian Peninsula, regions of West Asia, and, under the Roman Empire, in Europe. The trade to the Roman Empire is documented for centuries before the Arab conquest. After the Muslim conquest of the Maghreb was complete about 710, the trade was managed by Muslims including Arabs, Berber elites, and Arabized Berbers, and the journey was made easier by the widespread use of camels.

Estimates of the total number of black slaves moved across the Sahara after the Muslim conquest range from 10 to 18 million between the mid-7th century and the 20th century, when the trade was made illegal everywhere. Slavery is still widespread in North Africa; in Libya it preys especially on voluntary migrants from sub-Saharan Africa.

== Trans-Saharan slave trade before the Muslim conquest ==
=== Via the Red Sea or the Nile corridor to Egypt ===
Records of slave trading and transportation in the Sahara date as far back as the 3rd Millennium BC during the reign of the Egyptian king Sneferu who crossed the fourth cataract of the Nile into what is today modern Sudan to capture slaves and send them north. In such wars and raids, ancient Nubians were taken as slaves by the ancient Egyptians. In the mid first century, a sailor's guide to the Red Sea mentioned slaves as a commodity traded from that area and from further south. Among only ten slave sales recorded from late antique Egypt, four were from the Red Sea or beyond, four were homeborn, one was from Gaul, and one had been exposed as an infant. A sixth-century Alexandrian writer simply assumed that slaves were Aethiopians. A group of "Aethiopian" slaves was reported from Egypt, and black slaves were known to ancient Syriac authors. In late antiquity the trade seems to have intensified; a 6th century merchant from Alexandria reported that most slaves imported into the Empire came from Aethiopia.

=== Through the Western Sahara to Roman Mauritania ===
A third-century inscription lists the imposts on goods traded to the Roman areas on the Mediterranean coast of the Maghreb; slaves are the first commodity listed, though there is no indication of whether they had travelled all the way across the Sahara or only from the dry but populated semi-desert zone north of the desert proper. A commercial survey of the Roman Empire from the mid 300s mentions Mauretania as a particularly good source for slaves. There are references to Mauretanian slaves in Egypt. Saint Ambrose in Italy knew of girls from Mauretania whose families were in chains, but had still managed to maintain their virginity, and Saint Augustine of Hippo Regius found it incomprehensible that a Getulian slave should want to escape the northern coast and return to his arid native land. In 428, when the Vandal conquest of Roman Africa would have made impossible their usual operations further west, gangs of ruthless slave-raiders operated within the Roman provinces in the central Maghreb. They sold their captives to a specialized group of Galatian merchants for export. These merchants had long-standing connections with powerful patrons who shielded them from legal threats. For the Roman slave trade, the nomadic tribes of the semi-desert were a long-term source of victims.

=== Across the central Sahara ===
The Garamantes of the Fezzan Basin relied heavily on slave labor from sub-Saharan Africa. They used slaves in their own communities to construct and maintain underground irrigation systems known to Berbers as foggara. Ancient Greek historian Herodotus recorded in the 5th century BC that the Garamantes enslaved cave-dwelling "Aethiopians", chasing them with chariots.<re>Herodotus, Histories, 4.183</ref> The cave-dwellers may have been of the Tichitt tradition, whose artifacts have been found in Garamantian sites. Julius Maternus visited the king of the Garamantes in the mid-first century and went on such a raid.

The ancient Garamantian caravan trade route between the coast of Tripolitania across the Sahara to Lake Chad may have transported animals for Roman beast-hunts, gold, red gemstones, and raw material for food processing and perfume manufacture, but also slaves; the African slave trade was however likely limited prior to the Islamic period, and African slaves appear to have been few in the Roman Empire, where they were viewed as exotic luxury slaves. The empire imposed customs tax on the trade of slaves.

In the early Roman Empire, the city of Lepcis established a slave market to buy and sell slaves from the African interior. The portico in Lepcis Magna may have been used as a slave market. Ostraca from Bu Djem, a Roman fort south of Lepcis along a major trans-Saharan route, document Garamantian traders and black slaves. A third-century inscription from coastal Hadrumetum preserves a vicious invective against both Garamantes and the black slaves that they brought.

Another branch of the trans-Saharan route may have terminated in Carthage, where, in the fifth century, slaves "Ethiopian by colour" are recorded.

There is a minority view that the high demand for slaves in the Roman Empire stimulated a slave trade in this period that may have been greater than after the Muslim conquest. Whatever the exact numbers, the Muslim slave trade across the Sahara was not new, it used slave routes and supply methods that were already well-established.

== Trans-Saharan slave trade after the Muslim conquest ==
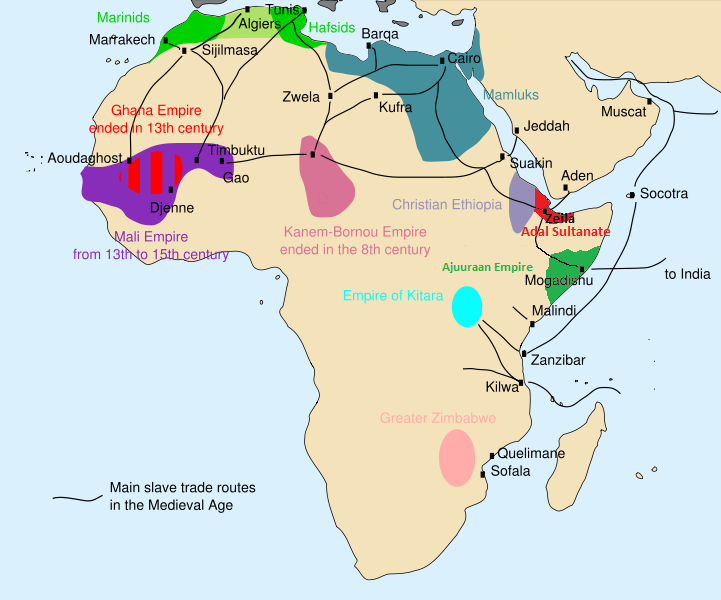
The main slave routes in medieval Africa

The slave trade through the Sahara is thought have increased greatly when the Arabs and Berbers introduced large numbers of camels into the desert, establishing a massive slave trade that victimized the interior of Africa, using the routes and means of supply that survived from the Roman period.

In later centuries, the trans-Saharan slave trade contributed to a mass movement of sub-Saharan Africans into the Maghreb, Egypt, and the wider Near East. Notable Islamic caliphs and rulers with varying degrees of sub-Saharan ancestry include Abu al-Misk Kafur, al-Mustansir Billah, Yaqub al-Mansur, Abu al-Hasan Ali ibn Othman, and Moulay Ismail Ibn Sharif.

Paul Lovejoy estimates that around 6 million black slaves were transported across the Sahara between the years 650 AD and 1500 AD. The trans-Saharan slave trade, established in Antiquity, continued during the Middle Ages. Following the early 8th-century conquest of North Africa, Arabs, Berbers, and other ethnic groups ventured into Sub-Saharan Africa first along the Nile Valley towards Nubia, and also across the Sahara towards West Africa. They were interested in the trans-Saharan trade, especially in slaves, as there was a constant demand for slaves in the eastern Arab nations and Constantinople. The Muslim slave traders distinguished themselves from the peoples on the other side of the Sahara, referring to these African populations as Zanj or Sudan meaning "black".

Arabs would routinely acquire slaves through violent raiding, followed by capturing them and sending them on dangerous forced marches across the Sahara to slave markets where they would be treated as chattel i.e. as personal property that can be bought and sold. In North Africa, the main slave markets were in Morocco, Algiers, Tripoli, and Cairo. Sales were held in public places such as souks. During the era of the Fatimid Caliphate (909–1171), the majority of slaves were Europeans taken along European beaches during conflicts.

=== The Sahel ===
Sanhaja Berbers would import horses from Morocco in exchange for slaves from the Jolof Empire (Wolof, Senegal).

Duarte Pacheco Pereira noted that African slaves were imported from Mali, and Jalofo (Senegal) by Arabs and the Sanhaja, with a poor horse being worth ten to 12 slaves

Aside from raiding, slaves could also be obtained by purchasing them from local black rulers. The 9th century Arab historian Ya'qubi states:

They [the Arabs] export black slaves...belonging to the Mira, Zaghawa, Maruwa, and other black races who are near to them and whom they capture. I hear that the black kings sell blacks, without pretext and without war.

Indeed, few sub-Saharan African rulers would resist the slave trade, while many chiefs would become middlemen in the trafficking, rounding up members of nearby villages to be sold to visiting merchants. The 12th-century Arab geographer al-Idrisi noted that Sub-Saharan Africans would also participate in slave raiding stating that:

The people of Lemlem are perpetually being invaded by their neighbors, who take them as slaves... and carry them off to their own lands to sell them by the dozens to the merchants. Every year great numbers of them are sent off to the Western Maghreb.

Al-Idrisi would also describe the different methods Muslim merchants would use to enslave blacks, recording that some would "steal the children of the Zanj using dates...lure them with dates and lead them from place to place, until they seize them, take them out of the country and transport them to their own countries". In 1353, the Berber explorer Ibn Battuta would record accompanying a trade caravan to Morocco which carried 600 black female slaves who were to be used as domestic servants and concubines. When Battuta visited the ancient African kingdom of Mali he recounted that the local inhabitants vied with each other in the number of slaves and servants they had, and was himself given a slave boy as a "hospitality gift."

The routes taken by slave caravans transporting slaves depended on their destination. Slaves headed to Egypt would be carried by boat down the Nile and slaves headed to Arabia would be sent to ports on the Red Sea such as Suakin and Assab. Slaves headed to North Africa would have to take the Saharan trade routes which had been in use since around 1000 BC. These include routes such as the ones from Tripoli–Ghadames–Ghat–Hoggar–Gao connecting modern-day Libya to Nigeria, the Tripoli-Fezzan-Bornu route, connecting Libya to areas of what are today Chad, Niger, and Cameroon, and the east–west route connecting Egypt to Ghana, Mali, and Songhai. Kanem–Bornu–Zawila was another route to North Africa as the Kanem–Bornu Empire in the eastern part of Niger was an active part of the trans-Saharan slave trade for centuries, and the trade formed the basis of the empire's prosperity.

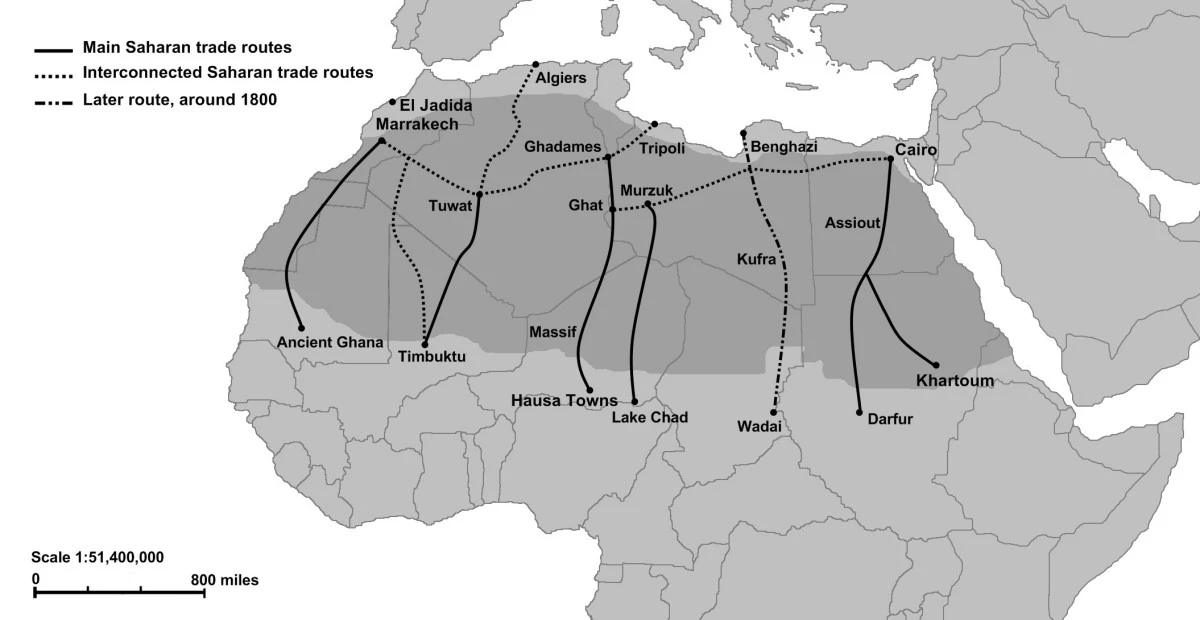
Main routes and towns of the trans-Saharan slave trade

Passage through the Sahara required the expertise of ethnic groups whose lifestyles were uniquely adapted for survival in scorching, arid environments, namely the local Berber tribes and the foreign Bedouins from Arabia. For example, the Tuareg and others who are indigenous to Libya facilitated, taxed and partly organized the trade from the south along the trans-Saharan trade routes. Various nomadic peoples played critical roles as guards, guides, and camel drivers. As a result, they were granted autonomy and treated as allies by governments of North Africa. Oases were vital waystations for caravans and those such as Awjila, Ghadames, and Kufra in Libya allowed both north–south and east–west travel. Even with expert help the passage could still prove deadly to merchants and slaves. Sometimes whole caravans of thousands of people could disappear without a trace.

The goods exchanged in the trans-Saharan slave trade varied. In the 10th century, the Muslim scholar Mutahhar ibn Tahir al-Maqdisi described the trade between the Islamic world and sub-Saharan Africa as consisting of food and clothing being imported into sub-Saharan Africa while slaves, gold, and coconuts were exported out of sub-Saharan Africa. Later, the 16th century Andalusian writer Leo Africanus wrote that traders from Morocco would bring horses, European cloth, clothing, sugar, books, and brass vessels to Sudan in order to exchange them for slaves, civets and gold. According to Africanus, the sultan of Bornu would accept payment for slaves only in horses, with an exchange rate of up to twenty slaves for one horse.

The range of tasks given to slaves was varied and included servile labor utilized for "irrigation, pastoralism, mining, transport, public works, proto-industry, and construction." In general black slaves were used as laborers, servants and eunuchs. Some female slaves could be used for labor, but most would be used for domestic chores and concubinage. Eunuchs, who were around seven times more expensive than non-castrated males could be used as harem guards, administrators, tutors, secretaries, commercial agents, and even concubines. Due to strictures within Islamic law, slaves would not usually be castrated within Muslim territory and therefore would be castrated before being sent across the Sahara. Sometimes slaves were castrated after purchase in North African slave markets. Conditions within the mining industry were notoriously harsh especially the salt mines of Basra where tens of thousands of black slaves toiled in extremely miserable conditions living on insufficient amounts of food. This poor treatment led to the bloody Zanj Rebellion or "black revolution". Ya'qubi records that both male and female slaves were employed in the copper mines of Upper Egypt. The Qarmatian Republic of eastern Arabia is said to have employed 30,000 blacks slaves to perform all difficult labor. Some black slaves served in the military forces of North Africa. For example, the Zirid dynasty used black slaves imported from Sudan via Zawila.

In some instances, Christians in Africa would acquiesce to Muslims' demands that they be provided with slaves. In 641 AD during the treaty known as the Baqt was signed establishing an agreement between the Nubian Christian state of Makuria and the new Muslim rulers of Egypt, in which the Nubians agreed to give Muslim traders more privileges of trade in addition to sending 442 slaves every year to Cairo as tribute. This treaty remained intact for 600 years all while the slave trade within Nubia continued unimpeded.

In the Muslim culture of the Middle Ages, blackness became increasingly identified with slavery. This was justified by appeals to a specific interpretation of the biblical story of Curse of Ham that posited Ham had been cursed by Noah in two ways, the first, the turning of his skin black, and the second, that his descendants would be doomed to slavery. Muslim slave traders would use this as a pretext to enslave blacks, including black Muslims. In the late 14th century, a black king of Bornu wrote a letter to the sultan of Egypt complaining of the continual slave raids perpetrated by Arab tribesmen, which were devastating his lands and resulting in the mass enslavement of the black Muslim population of the region. In Al-Andalus, the area of medieval Iberia under Islamic control, black Muslims could be legally held as slaves in slavery in Al-Andalus. This all occurred despite the orthodox Muslim jurist position that no Muslim, regardless of race, could be enslaved. Even as late as the 19th century, many of the common people in Islamic society still believed that enslavement based on skin color, rather than based on religion, was approved by the religious laws of Islam.

In 1416, al-Maqrizi told how pilgrims coming from Takrur (near the Senegal River) brought 1,700 slaves with them to Mecca. In the late 16th century, access to slaves in the areas of the former Songhai Empire in West Africa were cut off due to the anarchy in the area caused by the Moroccan armies' invasion of Songhai headed by al-Mansur. This necessitated the substitution of the former Songhai route with the Benghazi–Wadai route and others through Sudan. After Europeans had settled in the Gulf of Guinea, the trans-Saharan slave trade became less important.

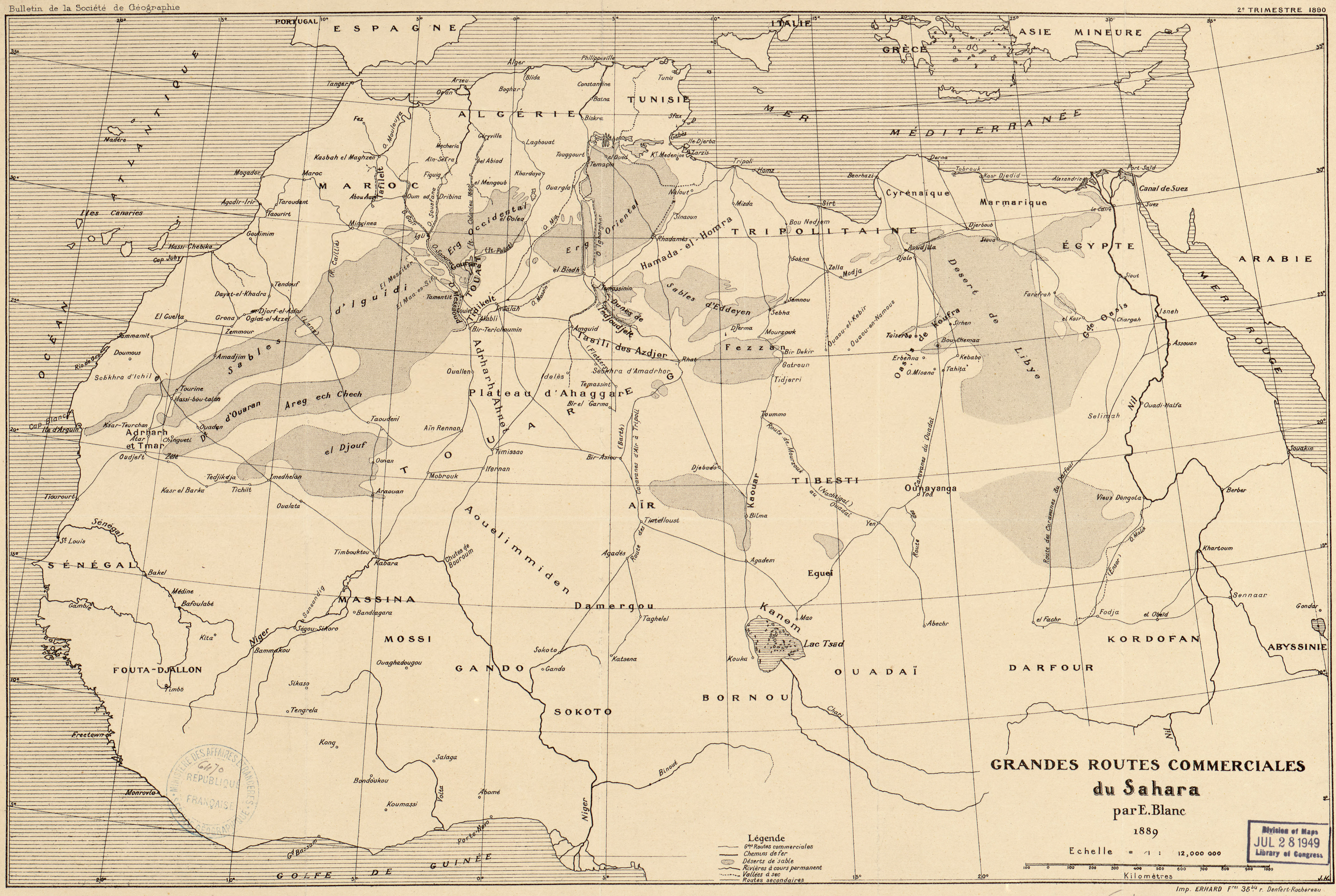
French-language map of major historic trans-Saharan trade routes (1889)

Arabs were sometimes made into slaves in the trans-Saharan slave trade. In Mecca, Arab women were sold as slaves according to Ibn Butlan, and certain rulers in West Africa had slave girls of Arab origin. According to al-Maqrizi, slave girls with lighter skin were sold to West Africans on hajj. Ibn Battuta met an Arab slave girl near Timbuktu in Mali in 1353. Battuta wrote that the slave girl was fluent in Arabic, from Damascus, and her master's name was Farbá Sulaymán. Besides his Damascus slave girl and a secretary fluent in Arabic, Arabic was also understood by Farbá himself. The West African states also imported highly trained slave soldiers.

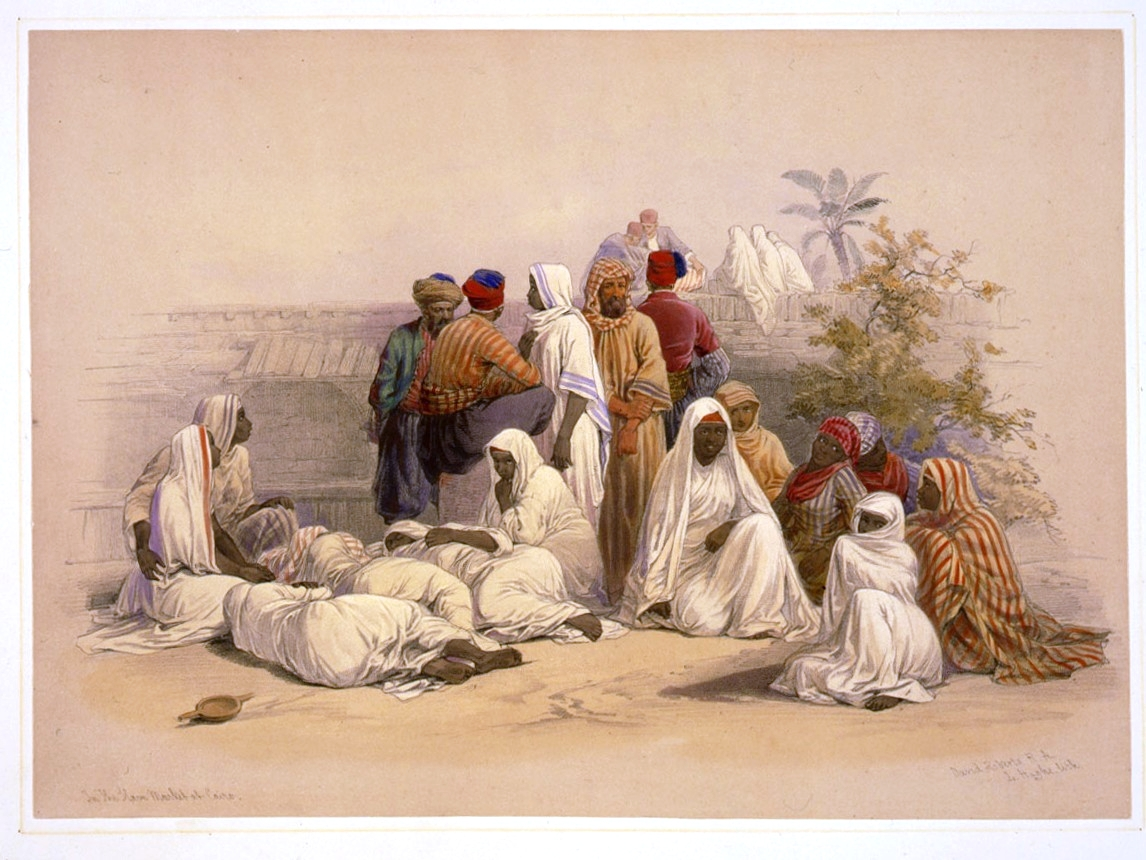
A slave market in Cairo. Drawing by David Roberts, circa 1848.

Under the Saadi dynasty, Morocco's sugar industry was dependent on sub-Saharan African slave labor. According to Paul Berthier, the need for slave labor on Moroccan sugar plantations was a major reason for the 16th century Saadian invasion of the Songhai Empire.

== Late trans-Saharan slave trade ==
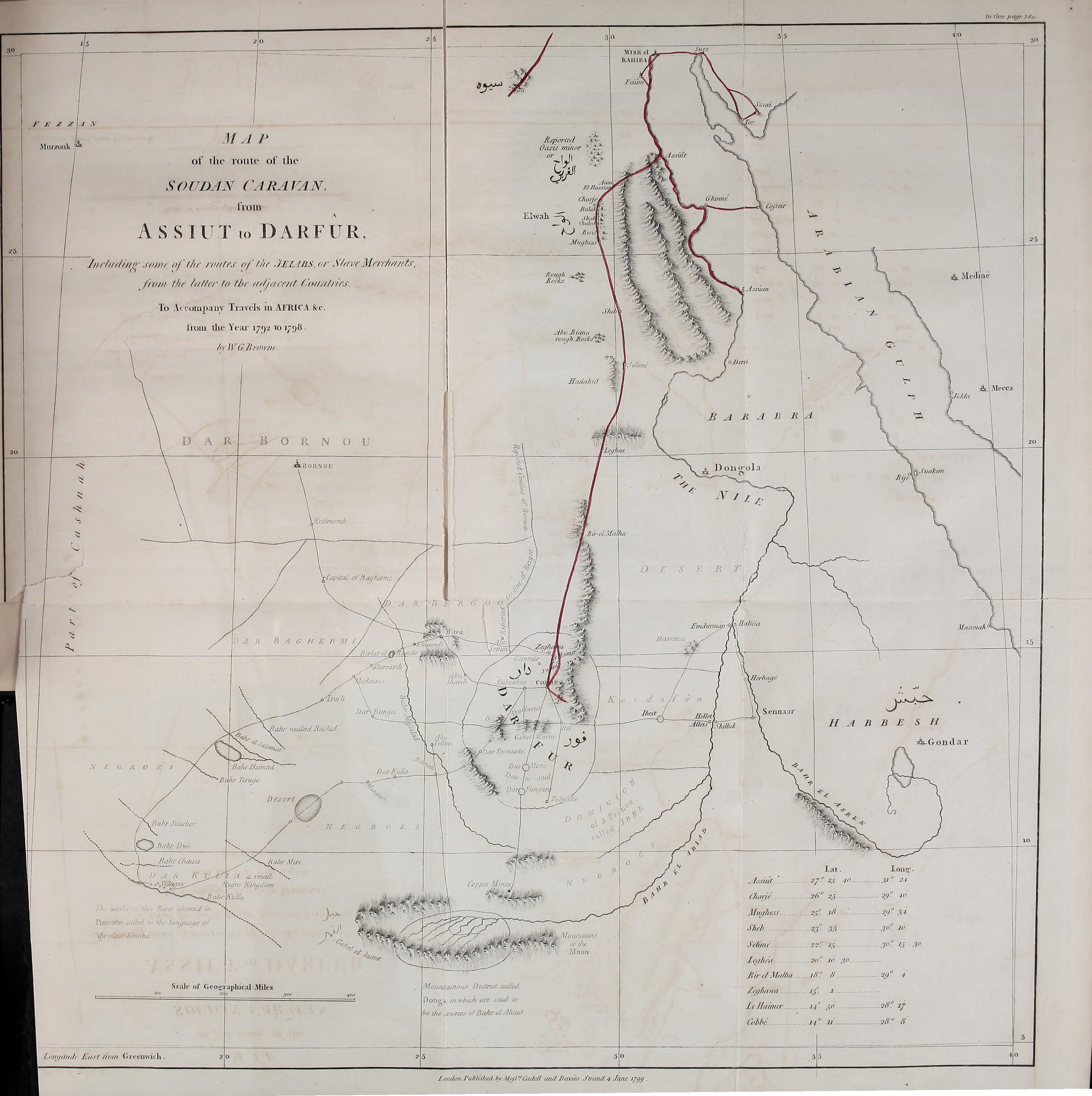
Englishman William George Browne rode with the Darb Al Arbain caravan in the 1790s; it delivered "Slaves, male and female" to Egypt.

In Central Africa, during the 16th and 17th centuries, slave traders continued to raid the region as part of the expansion of the Saharan and Nile River slave routes. It is estimated that, in the 17th and 18th centuries, 1.4 million slaves were forced to make the trek through the Sahara Captives were enslaved and shipped to the Mediterranean coast, Europe, Arabia, the Western Hemisphere, or to the slave ports and factories along the West and North Africa coasts or South along the Ubanqui and Congo rivers.

1.2 million slaves are estimated to have been sent through the Sahara in the 19th century. In the 1830s, a period when slave trade flourished, Ghadames was handling 2,500 slaves a year. Even though the slave trade was officially abolished in Tripoli by the Firman of 1857, this law was never enforced, and continued in practice at least until the 1890s. In Tripoli, G. F. Lyon recorded that from 4,000 to 5,000 slaves were processed annually with raids to areas like Kanem-Bornu providing sources of captives. As a witness to the behavior of the slave dealers, Lyon described their behavior in Libya:

None of the owners were ever without their whips which were in constant use...no slave dares to be ill or unable to walk, but when the poor sufferer dies the master suspects there must have been "something wrong inside" and regrets not having liberally applied the usual remedy of burning the belly with a red hot iron" thus reconciling to themselves their cruel treatment of these unfortunate creatures.

Other 19th-century European explorers recorded their perilous experiences traveling through the Saharan Desert alongside slave caravans. The explorer Gustav Nachtigal reported finding numerous bones at desert springs that had run dry. Nachtigal estimated that for every one slave that successfully arrived at the market three or four had either died or escaped. Cold could also kill in the desert as the explorer Heinrich Barth relayed a story that the vizier of Bornu had lost forty slaves in a single night in Libya. A British account described one hundred skeletons.

By 1858, the British consul in Tripoli had recorded that more than 66% of the value shipped across the Sahara was made up by slaves. The British Consul in Benghazi wrote in 1875 that the slave trade had reached an enormous scale and that the slaves who were sold in Alexandria and Constantinople had quadrupled in price. This trade, he wrote, was encouraged by the local government. By the mid 19th century, it is possible that nearly 10,000 slaves were being transported to North Africa yearly. French officials estimated that slaves were between 30% and 50% of the population of the French Sahel at the end of the 19th century. The Muslim historian Ahmad ibn Khalid an-Nasiri bemoaned the "unlimited enslavement of blacks" in 19th century North Africa "where men traffic them like beasts or worse" and where the majority of slaves were Muslims who should have been exempt from slavery because of their religious status.

Slaves were marched in shackles from across the Sahara via the Trans-Saharan slave trade to the Nile, while dying from exposure and swollen feet.

Adolf Vischer wrote in an article published in 1911 that: "...it has been said that slave traffic is still going on on the Benghazi–Wadai route, but it is difficult to test the truth of such an assertion as, in any case, the traffic is carried on secretly". At Kufra, the Egyptian traveller Ahmed Hassanein Bey found out in 1916 that he could buy a girl slave for five pounds sterling while in 1923 he found that the price had risen to 30 to 40 pounds sterling. Another traveler, the Danish convert to Islam Knud Holmboe, crossed the Italian Libyan desert in 1930, and was told that slavery is still practiced in Kufra and that he could buy a slave girl for 30 pounds sterling at the Thursday slave market.

According to James Richardson's testimony, when he visited Ghadames, most slaves were from Bornu. According to Raëd Bader, based on estimates of the Trans-Saharan trade, between 1700 and 1880 Tunisia received 100,000 black slaves, compared to only 65,000 entering Algeria, 400,000 in Libya, 515,000 in Morocco and 800,000 in Egypt.

=== Abolition ===
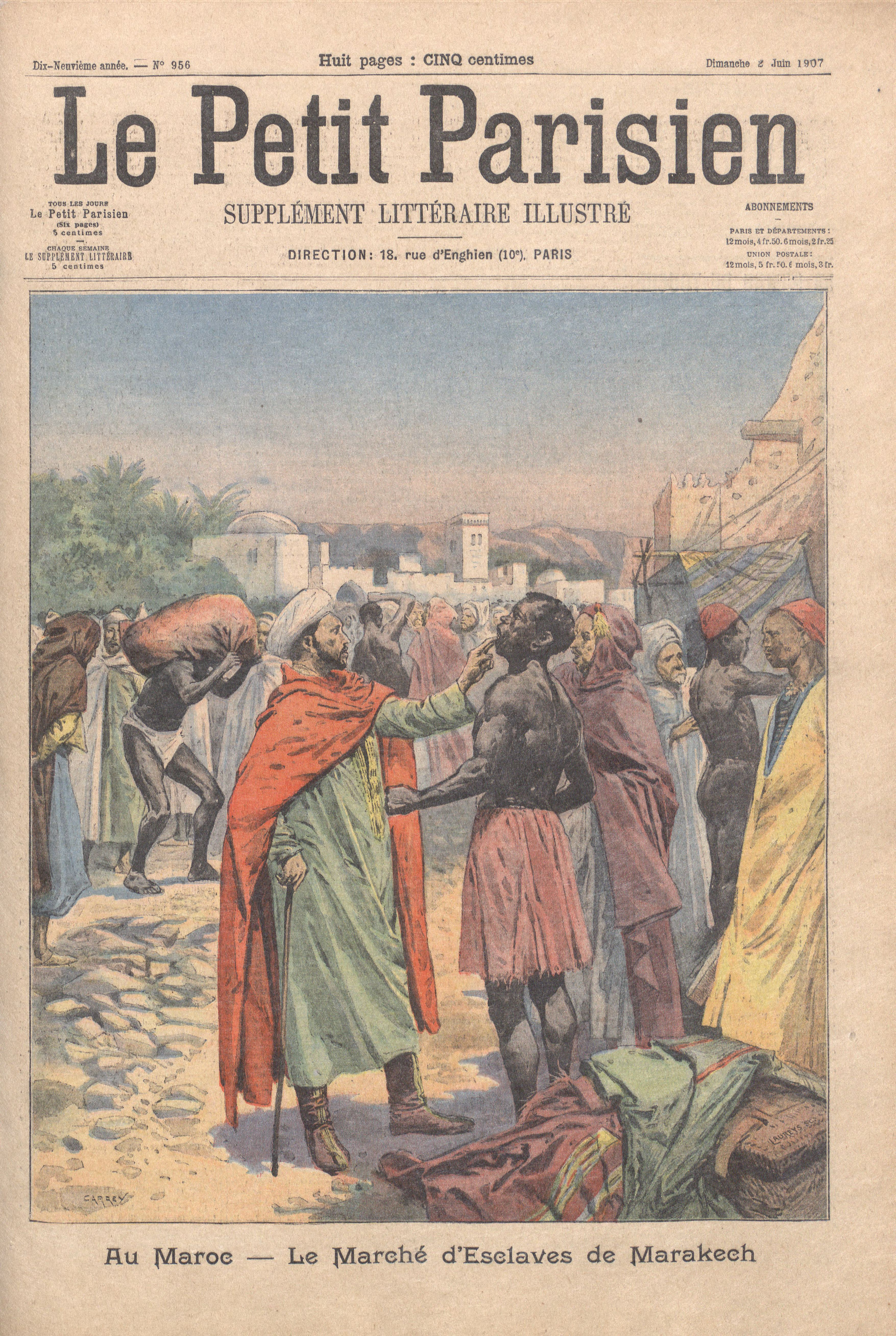
The slave market of Marrakesh as depicted on the cover of Le Petit Parisien of June 2, 1907.

After the establishment of the British and Foreign Anti-Slavery Society in 1839 to fight slave trading in the Mediterranean, Ahmad I ibn Mustafa, Bey of Tunis, agreed to outlaw exporting, importing, and selling slaves in 1842, and he made slavery illegal in 1846. In 1848, France outlawed slavery in Algeria.

Despite the British outlawing the slave trade in 1833, the troops of Muhammad Ali of Egypt continued to import approximately 20,000 slaves annually from Sudan. Merchant princes such as Al-Zubayr Rahma Mansur, appointed khedive in 1873, controlled trade in Bahr el Ghazal and the routes to Kordofan and Darfur.

In 1929, the Sanusi center of Kufra in the Sahara was pointed out as a center of the (Trans-Saharan) slave trade.

The Italians reported to the Advisory Committee of Experts on Slavery in the 1930s that all former slaves in Italian Tripolitania - slavery in Libya was since long formally abolished - were free to leave their former Arab owners if they wished, but that they stayed because they were socially depressed; and that in the oases of Cyrenaica and the interior of Sanusiya, the trans-Saharan slave trade had been erased in parallel with Italian conquest, during which 900 slaves had been freed in the Kufra slave market.

In 1936, the report to the Advisory Committee of Experts on Slavery from the French, British and Italian stated that they all surveyed the water sources along the caravan routes in the Sahara to combat the Trans-Saharan slave trade from Nigeria to North Africa. In 1937, the report to the Advisory Committee of Experts on Slavery, both France and Spain assured that they actively fought the slave raids from the Trans-Saharan slave traders, and in 1938, the French claimed that they had secured control over the border areas alongside Morocco and Algeria and effectively prevented the trans-Saharan slave trade in that area. Slavery was not abolished in Mauritania until 1981.

In the 1980s, during the Second Sudanese Civil War, there was a resurgence of the Sudanese slave trade under the National Islamic Front and groups such as the Baggara and Rizeigat.

=== Slavery in the post-Gaddafi Libya ===
Since the beginning of the Libyan Civil War of 2011, that saw the overthrow of Muammar Gaddafi's regime by NATO-backed anti-Gaddafi forces, Libya has been plagued by instability and migrants with little cash and no papers have become vulnerable. Libya is a major exit point for African migrants heading to Europe. The International Organization for Migration (IOM) published a report in April 2017 showing that many of the migrants from West Africa heading to Europe are sold as slaves after being detained by people smugglers or militia groups. African countries south of Libya were targeted for slave trading and transferred to Libyan slave markets instead. According to the victims, the price is higher for migrants with skills like painting and tiling. Slaves are often ransomed to their families and in the meantime until ransom can be tortured, forced to work, sometimes to death and eventually executed or left to starve if they can't pay for too long. Women are often raped and used as sex slaves and sold to brothels and private Libyan clients. Many child migrants also suffer from abuse and child rape in Libya.

After receiving unverified CNN video of a November 2017 slave auction in Libya, a human trafficker told Al-Jazeera that hundreds of migrants are bought and sold across the country every week. Migrants who have gone through Libyan detention centres have shown signs of many human rights abuses such as severe abuse, including electric shocks, burns, lashes and even skinning, stated the director of health services on the Italian island of Lampedusa to Euronews.

A Libyan group known as the Asma Boys have antagonized migrants from other parts of Africa from at least as early as 2000, destroying their property. Nigerian migrants in January 2018 gave accounts of abuses in detention centres, including being leased or sold as slaves. Videos of Sudanese migrants being burnt and whipped for ransom, were released later on by their families on social media. In June 2018, the United Nations applied sanctions against four Libyans (including a Coast Guard commander) and two Eritreans for their criminal leadership of slave trade networks.

== See also ==
- Afro-Arabs
- Baqt
- Barbary slave trade
- Comoros slave trade
- Haratin
- Indian Ocean slave trade
- Red Sea slave trade
- Zanzibar slave trade
- Comoros slave trade
- Trans-Sahara Highway
- Trans-Saharan trade
- Slavery in ancient Egypt
- Slavery in ancient Rome
- Slavery in Africa
- Human trafficking in Chad
- Slavery in Libya
- Slavery in Mali
- Slavery in Mauritania
- Slavery in Niger
- Slavery in Nigeria
