= Frere Treaty =

1873 anti-slavery treaty

Frere Treaty was a treaty signed between Britain and the Sultanate of Zanzibar in 1873. Signed by Barghash bin Said of Zanzibar, it formally prohibited all import of slaves to the Sultanate of Zanzibar and forced the closure of the slave market in Zanzibar Stone Town. It made it possible for the British to stop all slave ships in the Indian Ocean, becoming a major blow to the Indian Ocean slave trade.

== History ==
Opposition to slavery had been a part of Britain's foreign policy since it abolished its own slave trade in 1807. The treaty was a result of the Bartle Frere Mission to Zanzibar, led by Henry Bartle Frere. The Bartle Frere Mission addressed the issue of the Zanzibar slave trade between the Swahili coast in East Africa and Oman in the Arabian Peninsula, which at the time made up most of the Indian Ocean slave trade.

The Zanzibar slave trade had been an issue of British abolitionist interest for decades. The Moresby Treaty of 1822 had banned the export of slaves from Zanzibar to India, and the Hamerton Treaty of 1845 had prohibited the export of slaves to the Arabian Peninsula. An agreement with the British in 1867 further restricted the slave trade to be legal only from the African mainland to the Zanzibar archipelago. However, these agreements had been mainly nominal in nature. Since it was still legal to import slaves from the mainland to Zanzibar, it was in practice difficult for the British to control the slave ships and prevent them from continuing to Arabia. The British therefore deemed it necessary to prevent any legal slave ship traffic in order to prevent the export of slaves between the African mainland and the Arabian Peninsula.

The Frere Treaty of 1873 banned all further import of slaves from the African mainland into the Zanzibar archipelago. The treaty resulted in the closure of the open slave market in Stone Town on Zanzibar. It made it possible for the British fleet to stop all slave ships outside of the Swahili coast of East Africa and more efficiently combat the slave trade between the Swahili coast and Oman and reduce the Indian Ocean slave trade. The treaty was therefore an important victory in the fight against the Indian Ocean slave trade. However, the trade continued on a reduced scale into the 20th century. The Zanzibar slave traders continued to acquire slaves by kidnapping and traffic them by smuggling. Slavery in Zanzibar itself was not prohibited until 1897–1909.

== See also ==
- Firman of 1857
- Anglo-Egyptian Slave Trade Convention
- Anglo-Ottoman Convention of 1880
