= Kizimbani =

Settlement on Zanzibar, Tanzania

Coordinates: 9.0627051°S 39.3181937°E

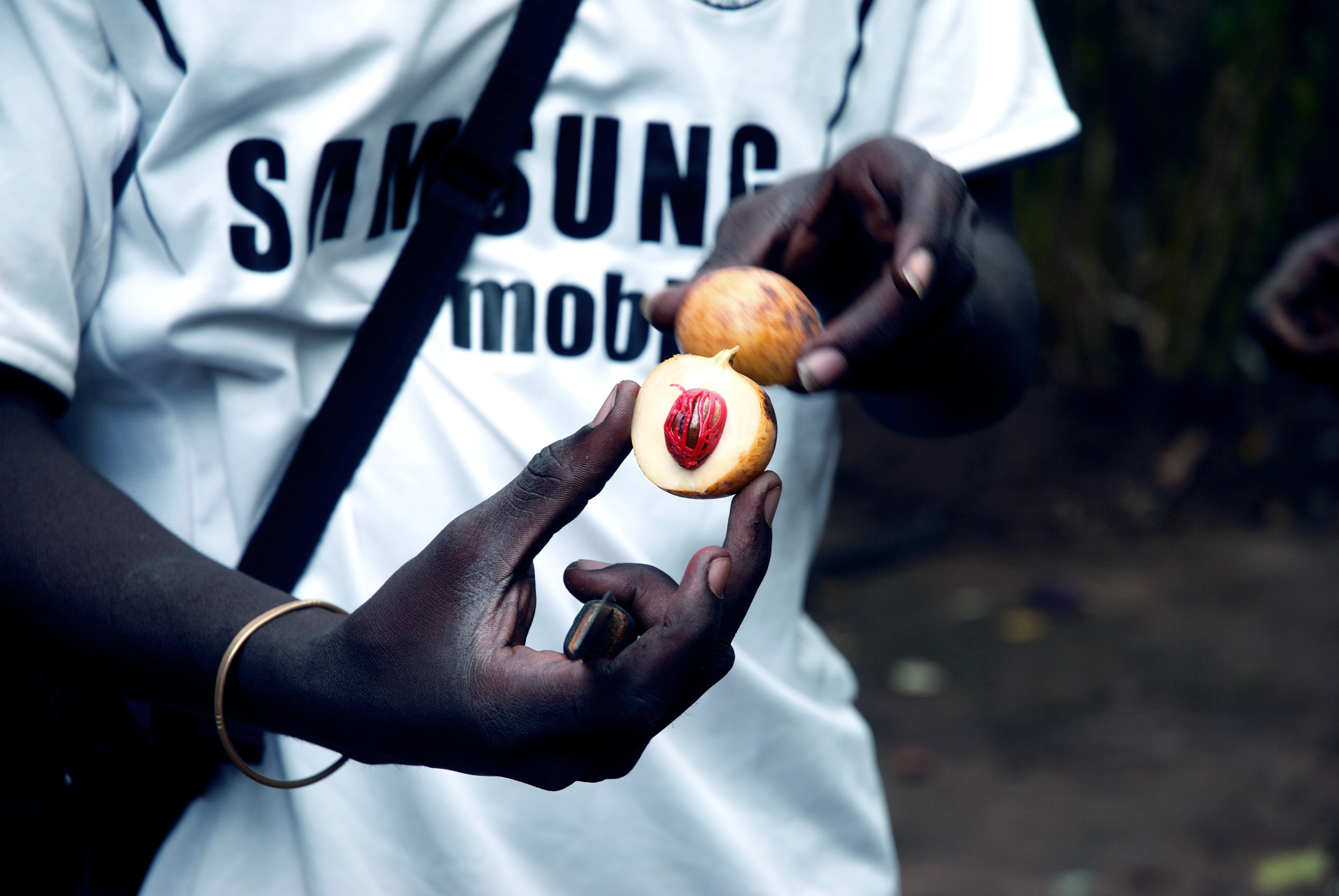
A local tour guide showing a nutmeg to visitors in Kizimbani's spice farm

Kizimbani (or Kisimbani) is a Tanzanian settlement in the Mjini Magharibi Region. It is located on Unguja, the main island of Zanzibar, Tanzania. It has been the site of clove production since being fostered by Said bin Sultan after the end of the slave trade in the 1800s. First settled in the early 19th century, the population of the area grew from 2,525 in 2002, to 3,304 by 2012.

== History ==
Kizimbani was first settled in the early 19th century.

Said bin Sultan, the sultan of the Omani Empire, oversaw the expansion of clove trees on Zanzibar due to financial losses caused by the end of the slave trade in Zanzibar. By 1834, there were 4,000 clove trees in Kizimbani that stood between 5 and 20 feet in height. These trees yielded 2.7 kilograms of cloves per year in 1835. A spice plantation is maintained by the Tanzanian government for the study of cinnamon, pepper, ginger, cocao, nutmeg, clove, and other spices.

Prince of Wales Charles III and Duchess of Cornwall Camilla toured the area in 2011.

== Demographics ==
The 2002 census reported a population of 2,535, with 1,315 being male and 1,219 being female. There were 526 households present in the town with the average size being 4.8. The 2012 census reported a population of 3,304, with 1,683 being male and 1,621 being female. The size of the average household was 4.8.

== Infrastructure ==
There were 1,058 buildings in Kizimbani in 2022. 982 of these buildings were single storey, 73 were under construction, and 3 were multi-storey.

== Works cited ==
=== Books ===
- Kusimba, Chapurukha; Kusimba, Sibel, eds. (2003). East African Archaeology: Foragers, Potters, Smiths, and Traders. Penn Museum. ISBN 9781931707619.
- Sheriff, Abdul (1987). Slaves, Spices and Ivory in Zanzibar: Integration of an East African Commercial Empire into the World Economy, 1770-1873. Boydell & Brewer. ISBN 9780852550151.

=== Journals ===
- Martin, Peter (1991). "The Zanzibar Clove Industry". Economic Botany. 45 (4). Springer Nature: 450–459. doi:10.2307/4255387. JSTOR 4255387.

=== News ===
- "Court Circular". The Daily Telegraph. 9 November 2011. p. 34 – via Newspapers.com.
- Turbett, Peggy (1 April 2008). "Zanzibar spices". Cleveland. Archived from the original on 8 July 2025.

=== Web ===
- "1988 Population and Housing Census". Tanzania. 1988. Archived from the original on 9 July 2025.
- "2002 Population and Housing Census". Tanzania. 2002. Archived from the original on 8 July 2025.
- "2012 Population and Housing Census" (PDF). Tanzania. 2012. Archived (PDF) from the original on 24 October 2018.
- "Tanzania Building Census 2022" (PDF). Tanzania. 2022. Archived (PDF) from the original on 30 April 2025.
