= Barghash bin Said of Zanzibar =

2nd Sultan of Zanzibar (r. 1870–88)

Barghash bin Said برغش بن سعيد (Arabic)
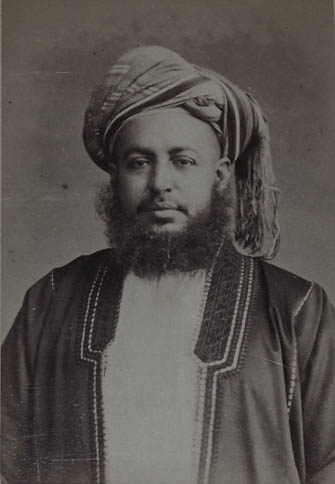
- 1875 photograph

Sultan of Zanzibar
- Reign: 7 October 1870 – 26 March 1888
- Predecessor: Majid bin Said
- Successor: Khalifah bin Said
- Born: c. 1836
- Died: 26 March 1888 (aged 50–51)
- Dynasty: Al Bu Said
- Father: Said bin Sultan

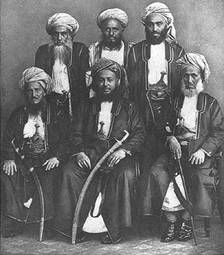
Barghash bin Said with his ministers

Sayyid Barghash bin Said al-Busaidi (c. 1836 – 26 March 1888) (Arabic: برغش بن سعيد البوسعيدي), an Afro-Omani Sultan and the son of Said bin Sultan, was the second Sultan of Zanzibar. He ruled Zanzibar from 7 October 1870 to 26 March 1888.

== Life and reign ==
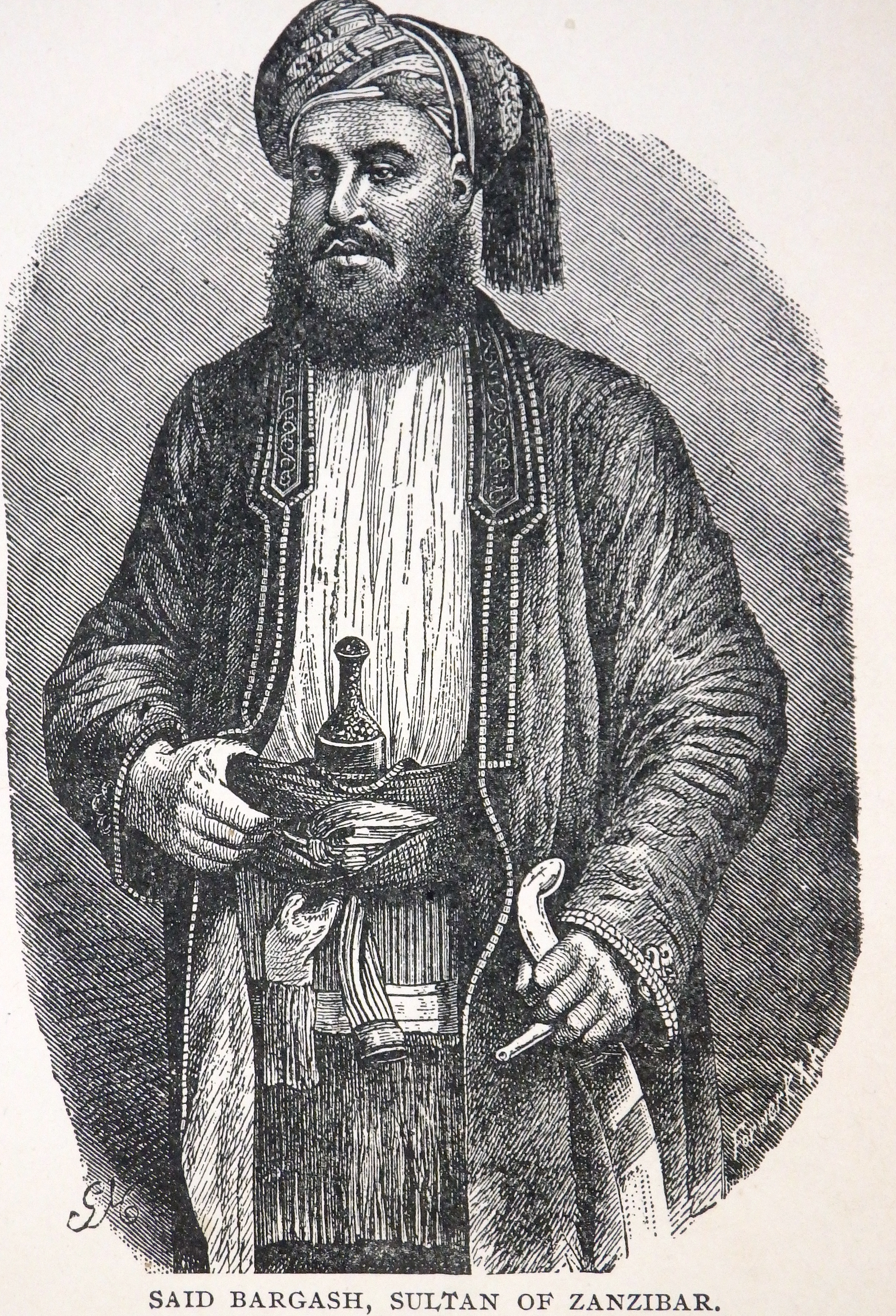
Sayyid Barghash

Barghash was born around 1836–1838 to Omani sultan, Said bin Sultan and an Ethiopian concubine. He was described as having sharp and charming character. He succeeded his elder half-brother Majid in 1871, having openly and adamantly contested his rule, and at one point was arrested for treason and exiled to India and Bombay.

Upon becoming sultan his reign became successful and is credited with building much of the infrastructure of Stone Town, including piped water, public baths, a police force, roads, parks, hospitals and large administrative buildings such as the (Bait el-Ajaib) House of Wonders. He was perhaps the last Sultan to maintain a measure of true independence from European control. He consulted with European "advisors" who had immense influence, but he was still the central figure they wrestled to control. He crossed wits with diplomats from Britain, America, Germany, France and Portugal and was often able to play one country off against another. It was his son, Khalid bin Barghash, who while vying for the succession, was the loser in the Shortest War. In 1859 a dispute broke out between the brothers Sayyid Majid, the second Sultan of Zanzibar, and Barghash. Their sister Sayyida Salme bint Said (later Emily Ruete) acted (at the age of fifteen) as secretary of Barghash's party. However, with the help of an English gunboat the insurrection of Barghash was soon brought to an end, and Barghash was sent into exile in Bombay for two years. Uniquely, he was placed under virtual house arrest within the compound of the British political resident for India, a move signaling direct British oversight of Zanzibari succession.

After the death of Majid, Barghash became Sultan. Ruete wrote in 1886:

It is a well-known fact in Zanzibar that Barghash, as soon as he had ascended the throne in 1870, suddenly and without any cause cast our second youngest brother Chalîfe into prison. The poor fellow had to languish there for three long years in the dungeon, in heavy iron fetters weighed with chains! And why? No one could say. It may have been feared that Chalîfe, being next in succession to the throne, might plot the same treacherous plans as Barghash himself had once tried against Madjid

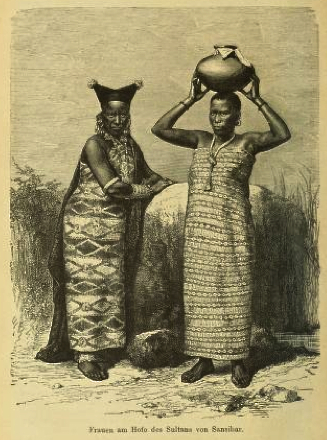
Women at the Court of the Sultan of Zanzibar, 1880s

According to Ruete, Barghash did not release Khalifah before one of their sisters prepared to set out for a pilgrimage for Mecca, and "he did not want to bring down upon himself a curse pronounced in the Holy City of the Prophet. But his sister did not pardon him before he had set free the innocent Chalîfe."

Sayyid Barghash had a treaty with the British to help stop the Zanzibar slave trade, but he was not always scrupulous in his commitment. In the late-1860s, he was suspected of taking money from the slave traders to allow them to continue the practice, and he maintained this double deal for some years; HMS Daphne liberated 2000 slaves in the Indian Ocean over many years, mainly near Zanzibar.

In June 1873 John Kirk was acting British Consul and received simultaneous and contradictory instructions from London, one to issue an ultimatum to the Sultan under threat of blockade that the slave trade must be unequivocally stopped and the slave market closed, and the other not to actually enforce a blockade which might be taken as an act of war pushing Zanzibar towards French protection. Kirk only showed the first instruction to Barghash, who capitulated within two weeks signing a further treaty with Britain prohibiting slave trade in his kingdom, and immediately closing the great slave market.

Towards the end of his reign Barghash had to witness the disintegration of his inherited empire. In 1884 the German adventurer Carl Peters made African chiefs on the Tanganyika mainland sign documents which declared their areas to be under German "protection". In February 1885 these acquisitions were ratified by the German Government through an imperial letter of protection. Few weeks later in April 1885, the German Dehnhardt brothers concluded a contract with the Sultan of Witu (former ruler of Pate) on the Kenya Coast near Lamu which was also put under official German protection. Bargash tried to send troops against the Witu ruler who in his view anyhow was supposed to be his subject when the appearance of a German fleet forced him to accept the German intrusion.

The British-German agreement of 29 October 1886 acknowledged the Sultan's rule over a 10-mile-strip along the coast from Portuguese Mozambique up to the Tana River and some towns on the Southeast African coast. This agreement, however, was only short-lived as it cut the German areas of influence off the sea.

Bargash did not live to see the 1888 agreement come into force which signed off the coastal strip of later Tanganyika to the Germans resulting in the uprising of the Sultans' subjects against the Germans and its subsequent repression.

In 1896, Bargash's son Khalid proclaimed himself sultan but was deposed after rejecting a British ultimatum which led to the 40 minute Anglo-Zanzibar War.

== Honours ==
- Grand Cross of the Order of the Tower and Sword of Portugal (GCTE) 1875
- Grand Cross of the Order of the Red Eagle, 1st Class in brilliants of Prussia 1875
- Grand Cross of the Legion of Honour 1875
- Knight Grand Cross of the Order of St Michael and St George (GCMG) 1883

== Sources ==
- Ruete, Emily, (1888): Memoirs of an Arabian Princess from Zanzibar (Many reprints)
- Ruete, Emily, Ulrich Haarmann (Editor), E. Van Donzel (Editor), Leiden, Netherlands, (1992): An Arabian Princess Between Two Worlds: Memoirs, Letters Home, Sequels to the Memoirs, Syrian Customs and Usages. Presents the reader with a picture of life in Zanzibar between 1850 and 1865. ISBN 90-04-09615-9

Preceded by Majid bin Said	Sultan of Zanzibar; 1870–1888	Succeeded by Khalifah bin Said
