= Emily Ruete =

- Sayyida; Princess of Zanzibar and Oman
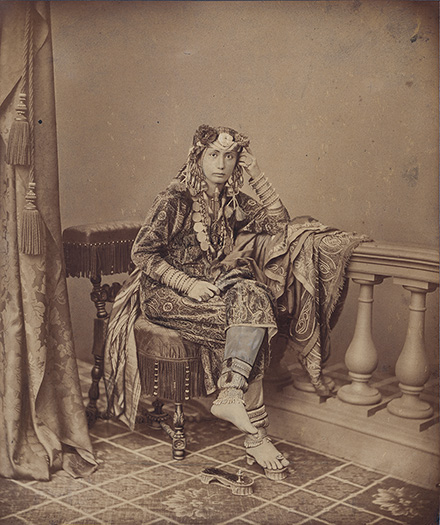
- Ruete in traditional attire, Hamburg, ca. 1868
- Born: Salme bint Said Sultan سالمة بنت سعيد سلطان; 30 August 1844; Zanzibar, Omani Empire
- Died: 29 February 1924 (aged 79); Jena, Weimar Republic
- Spouse: Rudolph Heinrich Ruete
- Issue: Heinrich Ruete; Antonie Brandeis; Rudolph Said-Ruete; Rosalie Trömer
- Dynasty: Al Said
- Father: Said bin Sultan
- Mother: Jilfidan
- Religion: Ibadi Islam, later Roman Catholicism

Emily Ruete (born Salme bint Said Sultan, Arabic: سالمة بنت سعيد سلطان; 30 August 1844 – 29 February 1924) was a Princess of Zanzibar and Oman. She was the youngest of the 36 children of Said bin Sultan, Sultan of the Omani Empire. She is the author of Memoirs of an Arabian Princess from Zanzibar.

== Early life in Zanzibar ==
Salme bint Said was born on 30 August 1844, the daughter of Sultan Said and Jilfidan, a Circassian slave of the Circassian slave trade, turned concubine (some accounts also note her as Georgian). Her first years were spent in the Bet il Mtoni palace, by the sea about eight kilometres north of Stone Town, which was mostly demolished in 1914. She grew up bilingual in Arabic and Swahili. In 1851, she moved to Bet il Watoro, the house of her brother Majid bin Said, the later sultan. Her brother taught her to ride and to shoot. In 1853, she moved with her mother to Bet il Tani. She secretly taught herself to write, a skill which was unusual for women in her culture at the time.

When her father died in 1856 she was declared of age, twelve years old, and received her paternal inheritance. This consisted of a plantation with a residence, and 5,429 pounds. After her father's death, her brother, Thuwaini bin Said became the Sultan of Muscat and Oman, while her another brother, Majid bin Said became the Sultan of Zanzibar.

In 1859, upon her mother's death, Salme received her maternal inheritance of three plantations. The same year, a dispute broke out between her brothers Majid and Barghash bin Said. Though she favoured Majid, her sister Khwala sided with Barghash. Because she could write, she became the secretary of Barghash's party at the age of fifteen. With the help of an English gunboat, the insurrection of Barghash was soon brought to an end and he was sent into exile in Bombay, British India for two years, while Salme withdrew to Kizimbani, one of her estates. Salme eventually moved back to Stone Town and reconciled with Majid. This earned her the lasting enemity of Barghash, as well as a split with Khwala.

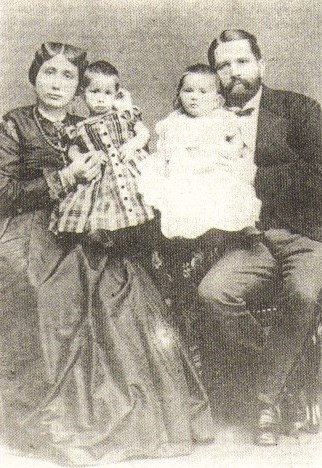
Ruete with her husband and two of their children

While living in Stone Town she became acquainted with her neighbour, a German merchant, Rudolph Heinrich Ruete (born 10 March 1839; died 6 August 1870) and became pregnant by him. In August 1866, after her pregnancy had become obvious, she fled on board the British frigate HMS Highflyer commanded by Captain Thomas Malcolm Sabine Pasley and was given passage on his ship to the British colony of Aden. There she took Christian instruction and was baptised prior to her marriage at Aden on 30 May 1867. She had given birth to a son, Heinrich, in Aden in December 1866, but he died in France en route to Germany in the summer of 1867.

== Life in Europe ==
The Ruetes settled in Hamburg, where they had another son and two daughters. They were:

- Antonie Brandeis (born Antonie Thawka Ruete) (25 March 1868 – 24 April 1945), who married Eugen Brandeis (1846–1930) in 1898 and had two daughters. From 1898-1904 she lived on Jaluit, Marshall Islands, where her husband served as German imperial governor. During this time, she started collecting ethnographic objects and taught herself photography. For nearly three decades, she was an active member of the German colonial women's movement.
- Rudolph Said-Ruete (13 April 1869 – 1 May 1946). A journalist and author, with the rise of the Nazi Party, he renounced his German citizenship in 1934 and settled in London, becoming a British subject and dying at Lucerne, Switzerland after World War II. In 1901, he married Mary Therese Matthias (1872–?) and had a son and a daughter, Werner Heinrich (1902-1962) and Salme Matilda Benvenuta Olga (1910–?). Through his marriage, he was a cousin of Alfred Moritz, 1st Baron Melchett, who became the first chairman of Imperial Chemical Industries.
- Rosalie Trömer (born Rosalie Ghuza Ruete) (16 April 1870 – 14 February 1948), who married Major-General Martin Trömer of the Royal Prussian Army.

Her husband died in 1870 after a tram accident, leaving Ruete in difficult economic circumstances because the authorities denied her inheritance claims. Partly to alleviate these economic problems, she wrote her memoirs, Memoiren einer arabischen Prinzessin in German which was published in the German Empire in 1886. It was translated into English and published as Memoirs of an Arabian Princess: An Autobiography. in 1888.

After the death of her husband, Ruete was caught up in the colonial plans of Otto von Bismarck. There were speculations that Bismarck wanted to install her son as Sultan of Zanzibar. She revisited Zanzibar in 1885 and in 1888. Between 1889 and 1892, she lived in Jaffa, Ottoman Empire from where she moved to Beirut, Ottoman Empire in 1892. In 1914, she returned to Europe to live with her daughter Rosalie in Bromberg, Prussia, where Martin Trömer was stationed as a military commander. She died in 1924 in Jena, Weimar Republic, at the age of 79, from severe pneumonia.

== Memoirs ==
Ruete wrote Memoiren einer arabischen Prinzessin, which was first published in the German Empire in 1886 by publisher H. Rosenberg (Hugo Mewis) in Berlin in two volumes. It was translated into English shortly afterwards and published in the United States and the United Kingdom of Great Britain and Ireland in 1888. The book provides the first known autobiography of an Arab woman. It presents the reader with an intimate picture of life in Zanzibar between 1850 and 1865, and an inside portrait of Ruete's family and life. The book has since been translated into multiple languages and reprinted multiple time. The third English version, translated by Lionel Strachey was published by Doubleday, Page & Company in New York in 1907.

In 1993, a new English translation of her book, expanded with memoirs and letters, was published as An Arabian Princess Between Two Worlds: Memoirs, Letters Home, Sequels to the Memoirs, Syrian Customs and Usages. In 2022, Memoirs of an Arabian Princess: An Accurate Translation of Her Authentic Voice, was translated from the original and expanded by Ruete's great-great-granddaughter, Andrea Emily Stumpf, into a series of five books.

== Archive and book collection ==
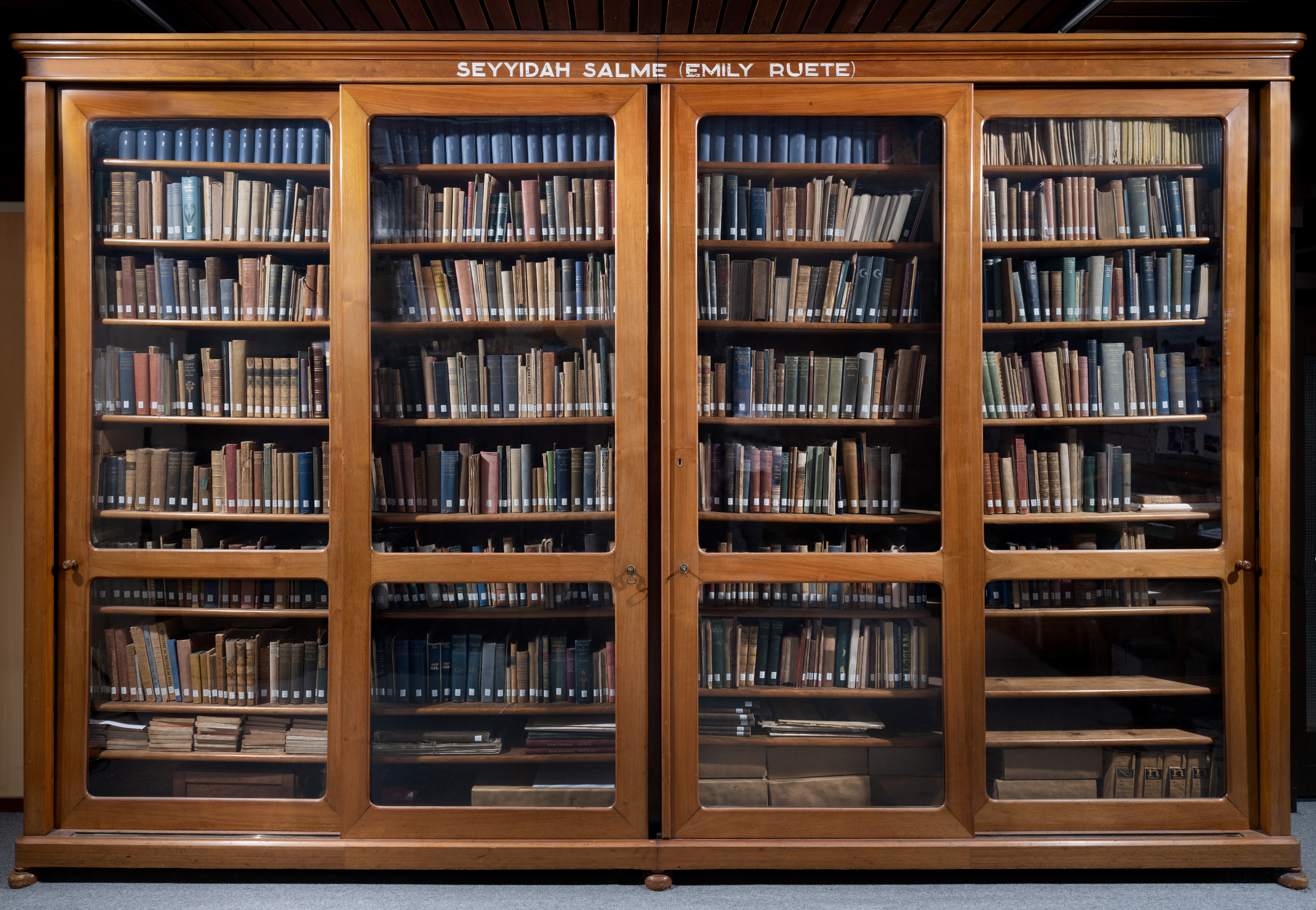
Said-Ruete library

Letter by Ruete to Snouck Hurgronje (1887)

Emily had befriended Dutch orientalist Christiaan Snouck Hurgronje in 1887. Shortly after Snouck Hurgronje's death, her son Rudolph Said-Ruete donated her book collection to the Oosters Instituut, created in memory of Snouck Hurgronje. The library was made available to scholars at the seat of the institute, the Snouck Hurgronje House, Rapenburg 61 in Leiden, The Netherlands. The books, the monumental bookcase, and other materials, were later housed in the Netherlands Institute for the Near East. Emily and Rudolph's archive is kept in the Leiden University Library which includes personal documents, photographs and correspondence.

There is a permanent exhibition about Emily Ruete in the People's Palace in Stonetown, the palace constructed by her brother, Barghash.

== In fiction ==
Emily Ruete appears as a minor character in M.M. Kaye's novel Trade Wind. The book, set in Zanzibar during the late 1850s, mentions her involvement with her brother Barghash's failed attempt to take the throne from their brother Majid and her subsequent interest in and marriage to Rudolph.
