= Moresby Treaty =

1822 anti-slavery treaty

The Moresby Treaty was an anti-slavery treaty between Sayyid Said, Sultan of Muscat and Oman and Fairfax Moresby, senior officer of Mauritius, on behalf of Great Britain in September 1822.

Initially composed of six articles, the purpose of the treaty was to limit the Indian Ocean slave trade by preventing the importation of slaves to British holdings in India and the Indian Ocean from land ruled by Omani Arabs in East Africa. The treaty barred the sale of slaves to Christians of any nationality, recognized the sultan’s jurisdiction over the waters near the East African coast, allowed for the installation of a British official in Zanzibar or the mainland, and created the Moresby Line.

== The Moresby Line ==
Among the stipulations was the creation of the Moresby Line. The line ran from the southernmost point of the sultan's territory in Africa – Cape Delgado in Mozambique – through the Indian Ocean to the city of Diu on the coast of India. The transportation of slaves west of the established line, a primarily Muslim zone of the Indian Ocean, was at this point considered legal but prohibited on the eastern side. To enforce this rule, warships were given the authority to confiscate ships carrying slaves in illegal waters east of the line and punish the captain in the same manner as a pirate, by "death without the benefit of clergy". The only exemption to this regulation provided for ships that had gone past the line due to conditions beyond their control including extreme weather conditions. Confusion arose as to who exactly was to enforce this part of the treaty as the English version of the text placed responsibility on the Oman while the Arab text placed the onus on the British.

== Amendment ==
On 17 December 1839 the treaty was expanded in scope, adding three more articles to the original agreement. The extension increased the area in which the transportation of slaves was considered illegal by moving the endpoint of the Moresby Line west to the Port of Pasni on the Makran Coast. Additionally, the amendment prohibited the sale of Somalis as slaves because, as Muslims, they were considered ‘free men’ by the Omani ruler who was a Muslim himself.

It was followed by the Hamerton Treaty in 1845.

== See also ==
- Hamerton Treaty
- Indian Ocean slave trade
- Zanzibar slave trade
- Suppression of the Slave Trade
