= Slavery in the Comoros =

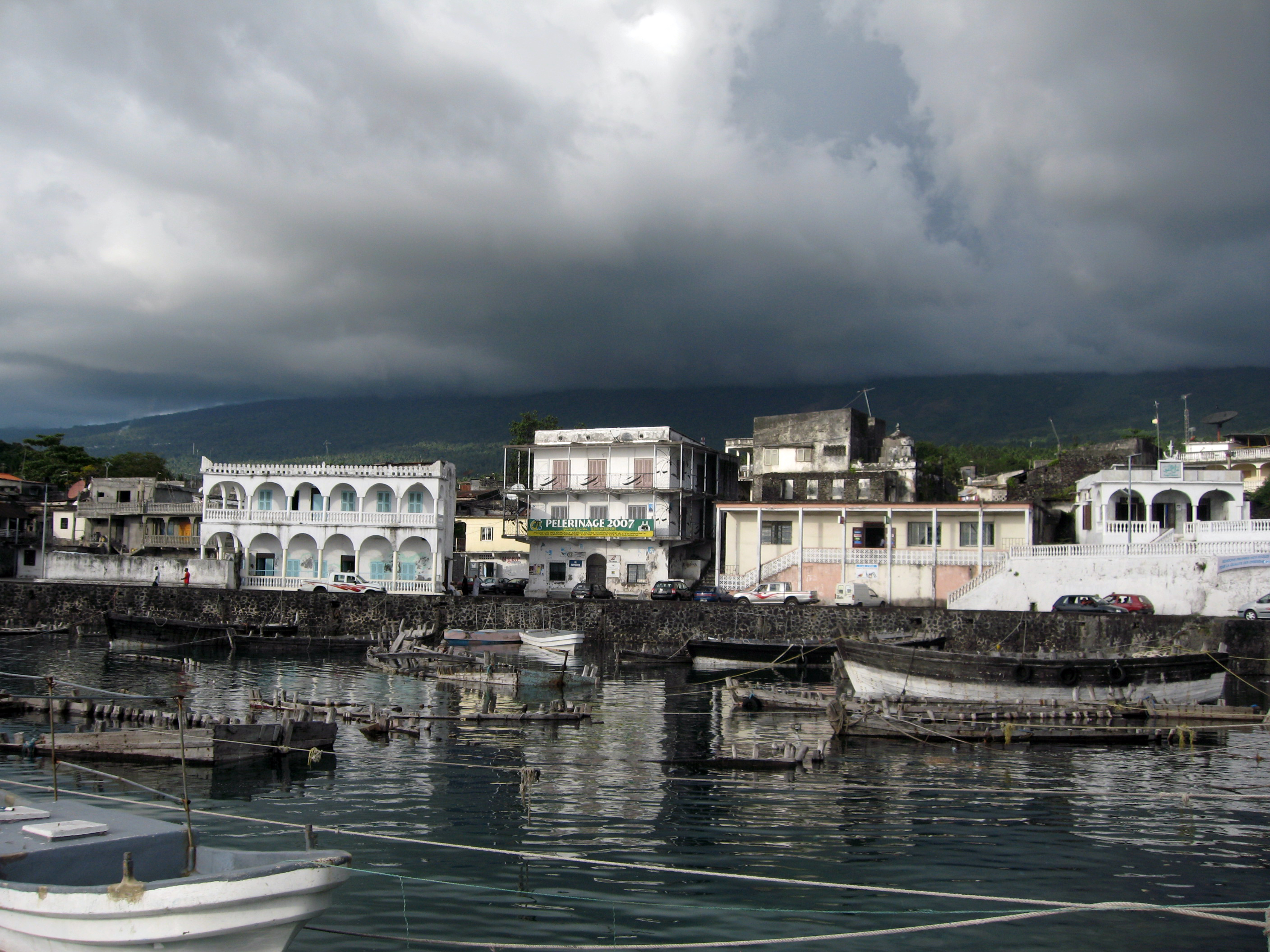
Moroni-Harbour

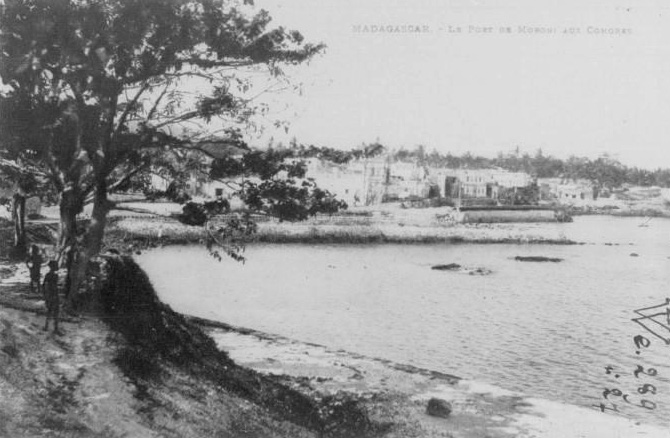
Moroni-Port

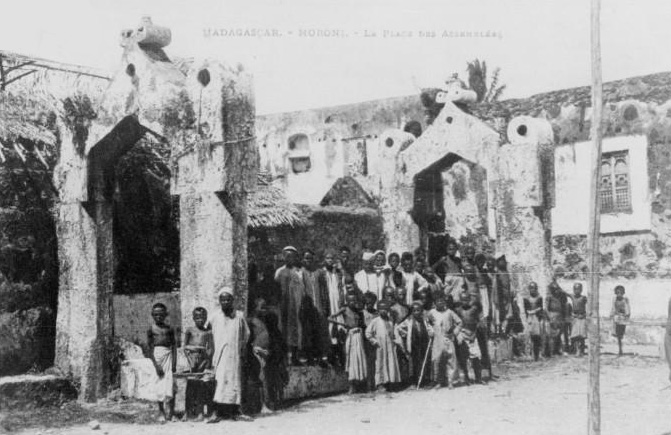
Moroni-Place des Assemblées

Slavery existed in the Comoros until 1904. The Comoros was a player in the Indian Ocean slave trade, where slaves from the Swahili coast of Eastern Africa were trafficked across the Indian Ocean to Oman in the Arabian Peninsula, and was one of the major players of the trade alongside the Zanzibar.

== History ==
Slavery is noted to have existed in the Comoros as long as the history of the islands is documented, and was possibly introduced by the Arab slave trade.

=== Comoros slave trade ===
After the 1820s, the Comoros slave trade expanded to a major part of the Indian Ocean slave trade, which was very lucrative and became one of the main incomes for the islands until the end of the 19th-century.

The Arabian dhow slaveships, was normally rented or a part of a commercial enterprice, with an Arab and Swaihili crew, partially or fully enslaved, in which the profit was shared between the owner, the captain and the crew (the enslaved crew members having to give half of their salary to their enslaver).

Along with Zanzibar, the Comoros exported slaves to Oman on the Arabian Peninsula.

The Comoros became a middle stop of the slave trade between the Swahili coast of Eastern Africa to French Réunion when slavery was abolished on Réunion and replaced by the engagé-system of indentured labor (1848–1864), when slaves were shipped to the Comoros, and then from the Comoros to Réunion as free indentured workers. The Comoros bought slaves from Portuguese Mozambique or the Arab slave traders of the Swahili coast, such as the Zanzibar slave trade, Ouitangonha, Angoche or Kilwa, who exported numerous makua-slaves to the Comoros. On the Comoros, the mainland slaves were kept for a year, after which they were exported to Réunion, officially as free indentured worker from the Comoros.

The Comoros also exported slaves to Madagascar until at least the 1860s.

In order to avoid the British Anti Slavery Patrol Fleet on the Indian Ocean, the slave ships from Zanzibar as well as from the Comoros used false papers from French Mayotte in the Comoros to give a false destination for their trip and avoid British confiscation.

=== Slave market ===
In the 16th-century, the Comoros became a harbor for European (Portuguese and Dutch) ships, which anchored to buy food supplies on their way between Madagascar and India, and to meet the food trade demand the Comorans produced more food by the labor of slaves imported from Madagascar and Portuguese Mozambique.

During the major Comoros slave trade of the 19th century, the already existing slavery on the Comoros expanded to major proportions, until 40 percent of the population were slaves in the 1860s.

The slaves lived in slave quarters in the stone cities and in slave villages on the countryside. Male slaves were trained to be craftsmen to maintain the stone cities and agricultural laborers, and female slaves were used as house slaves or concubines (sex slaves).

=== Abolition ===
The Comoros became a French protectorate in 1841 but was not a French colony and thereby not subjected to French law, which meant slavery was not automatically abolished when France abolished slavery in 1848. An exception was the island of Mayotte, which did become a French colony and slavery was indeed abolished in the 1840s.

Slavery was finally abolished in 1904. The former slaves however kept living in their former homes, and kept working with the same tasks for the same people and in practice continued to live as they did during slavery as late as the 1970s.

== See also ==
- Red Sea slave trade
- Indian Ocean slave trade
- History of slavery in the Muslim world
- History of concubinage in the Muslim world
- Human trafficking in the Middle East
