= Said bin Sultan =

Sultan of Muscat and Oman (1791–1856)

- Sayyid; Sultan of Oman and Zanzibar; أسد عُمان (the Lion of Oman)
- Portrait of Sultan Said, c. 19th century

Sultan of the Omani Empire
- Reign: 1804 – 19 October 1856
- Predecessor: Sultan bin Ahmad
- Successor: Thuwaini bin Said (as Sultan of Muscat and Oman); Majid bin Said (as Sultan of Zanzibar)
- Born: 5 June 1791; Samail, Oman
- Died: 19 October 1856 (aged 65); Seychelles
- Burial: Makusurani Cemetery
- Issue Detail: Thuwaini bin Said; Turki bin Said; Majid bin Said; Barghash bin Said; Khalifah bin Said; Ali bin Said; Emily Ruete
Names
- Said bin Sultan bin Ahmad bin Said Al Busaidi سعيد بن سلطان بن أحمد بن سعيد البوسعيدي
- Dynasty: Al Bu Said
- Father: Sultan bin Ahmad
- Mother: Ghanneyeh bint Saif Al Busaidi
- Religion: Ibadi Islam

Sayyid Said bin Sultan (Arabic: سعيد بن سلطان, Saʿīd bin Sulṭān, Swahili: Saïd bin Sultani) (5 June 1791 – 19 October 1856) was Sultan of Muscat and Oman, the fifth ruler of the Al Bu Said dynasty from 1804 to 4 June 1856. His rule began after a period of conflict and internecine rivalry of succession that followed the death of his father, Sultan bin Ahmad, in November 1804. He is regarded as one of the greatest Omani sultans.

Said's uncle Qais bin Ahmad finally agreed to Said's primacy after Said had killed his cousin, Badr bin Saif, a pretender to the throne. Said is noted for moving his capital to Zanzibar, where it remained during the time when the Omani Empire reached the zenith of its power and wealth.

== Early years ==
Said bin Sultan was son of Sultan bin Ahmad, who ruled Oman from 1791 to 1804. Sultan bin Ahmad died in 1804 on an expedition to Basra. He appointed Mohammed bin Nasir bin Mohammed al-Jabry as the Regent and guardian of his two sons, Salim bin Sultan and Said bin Sultan. Sultan's brother Qais bin Ahmad, the ruler of Sohar, decided to attempt to seize power. Early in 1805 Qais and his brother Mohammed marched south along the coast to Muttrah, which he easily captured. Qais then started to besiege Muscat. Mohammed bin Nasir tried to bribe Qais to leave, but did not succeed.

Mohammed bin Nasir called on Badr bin Saif for help. After a series of engagements, Qais was forced to retire to Sohar. Badr bin Saif became the effective ruler. Allied with the Wahhabis, Badr bin Saif became increasingly unpopular. To get his wards out of the way, Badr bin Saif made Salim bin Sultan governor of al Maṣna'ah on the Batinah coast and Said bin Sultan governor of Barka.

In 1806, Said bin Sultan lured Badr bin Saif to Barka and murdered him nearby. There are different accounts of what happened, but it seems clear that Said struck the first blow and his supporters finished the job. Said was acclaimed by the people as a liberator from the Wahhabis, who left the country. Qais bin Ahmad at once gave his support to Said. Nervous of the Wahhabi reaction, Said blamed Mohammed bin Nasir for the murder.

On 31st July 1806 Aisha bint Sultan Al Imam Ahmad bin Said Al Busaidi, a daughter of Sultan bin Ahmad, assumed the regency on behalf of her younger brother Said bin Sultan. She was a formidable woman, who conducted the affairs of government and frequently commanded her troops dressed in male clothing.

== Sultan ==
Said bin Sultan became the sole ruler of Oman, apparently with the consent of his brother. Their aunt, the daughter of the Sultan Sultan bin Ahmad, seems to have influenced this decision.

In 1820, he launched a punitive expedition against the Bani Bu Ali with the assistance of the East India Company. It was defeated, but the following year a larger Company force returned and defeated the tribe.

In 1822, he signed the Moresby Treaty, restricting the Zanzibar slave trade.

In 1835, he ratified a treaty with the United States on very favorable terms, that had been negotiated by Edmund Roberts at Muscat on 21 September 1833, and returned by USS Peacock.

In 1837, he conquered Mombasa (now in Kenya). In 1840, Said moved his capital from Muscat to Stone Town in Zanzibar, where Richard Waters was American Consul, and sent a ship to the United States to try to further a trading relationship.

In 1843 he nominated a nominal representative in Mogadishu and was forced to pay tribute to Sultan Yusuf Mahamud Ibrahim of the Sultanate of the Geledi.

In 1845, he signed the Hamerton Treaty, further restricting the Zanzibar slave trade.

Upon Said's death in 1856, his realm was divided. His third son, Thuwaini bin Said, became the Sultan of Muscat and Oman, and his sixth son, Majid bin Said, became the Sultan of Zanzibar.

The National Museum in Muscat houses numerous items of silverware and other possessions that belonged to Said.

== Children ==
Said had 36 children:

1. Sultan bin Said Al Busaidi (c. 1815–1851): an alcoholic, according to Ruete (Ch. 15), he left three sons, Saud, Faisal, and Muhammed
2. Khalid bin Said Al Busaidi (c. 1819–1854)
3. Thuwaini bin Said Al Busaidi (also called Tueni) (−1866): Sultan of Muscat and Oman, 1856–1866
4. Mohammed bin Said Al Busaidi (1826–1863): he "...was considered the most pious of our entire family.... cared little for the world and worldly goods.... possessed by... antipathy against Zanzibar" (Ch. 14, Ruete); he lived most of his life in Oman; father of Hamoud bin Mohammed, Sultan of Zanzibar.
5. Turki bin Said bin Sultan Al Busaidi (1832–1888): Sultan of Muscat and Oman, 1871–1888
6. Majid bin Said Al Busaidi (1834/5-1870): 1st Sultan of Zanzibar, 1856–1870
7. Ali bin Said Al Busaidi (?-1893)
8. Barghash bin Said Al Busaidi (1837–1888): 2nd Sultan of Zanzibar, 1870–1888
9. Abdul-Wahhab bin Said Al Busaidi (1840–1866)
10. Jamshid bin Said Al Busaidi (1842–1870)
11. Hamdan bin Said Al Busaidi (1843–1858)
12. Ghalib bin Said Al Busaidi
13. Sawedan bin Said Al Busaidi (1845–?)
14. Abdul-Aziz bin Said Al Busaidi (1850–1907)
15. Khalifah bin Said Al Busaidi (1852–1890): Sultan of Zanzibar, 1888–1890
16. Hamad bin Said Al Busaidi
17. Shuwaid bin Said Al Busaidi
18. Abbas bin Said Al Busaidi
19. Manin bin Said Al Busaidi
20. Ali bin Said al Busaidi (1854–1893): Sultan of Zanzibar, 1890–1893
21. Badran bin Said Al Busaidi (?-1887)
22. Nasir bin Said Al Busaidi (also called Nasor) (?-1887) went to Mecca with his older sister Chadudj: died in his twenties
23. Abdul-Rab bin Said Al Busaidi (?-1888)
24. Ahmad bin Said Al Busaidi
25. Talib bin Said Al Busaidi
26. Abdullah bin Said Al Busaidi
27. Sharife bint Said Sultan: the daughter of a Circassian woman, she was "a dazzling beauty with the complexion of a German blonde. Besides, she possessed a sharp intellect, which made her into a faithful advisor of my father's" (described in Ruete, Ch. 15)
28. Khole bint Said Sultan (died 1875): the daughter of an Assyrian Christian woman, she "was particularly close to our father; her enchanting personality, her cheerfulness and charm won him over completely" (Ruete, Ch. 15)
29. Aashe bint Said Sultan: full sister of Khole; after the death of their brother Hilal (1851), she "took motherly care of his eldest son Suud" (Ruete)
30. Chadudj bint Said Sultan: full sister of Majid; after his death (1870), she went with her younger brother Nasir to Mecca and died not long afterward (Ruete)
31. Shewane bint Said Sultan: the daughter of an Abyssinian woman; "a classical beauty ... endowed with a keen mind", she died early (Ruete)
32. Mettle bint Said Sultan: the daughter of an Abyssinian woman, she married a "distant cousin" in Stonetown and had "two charming twin boys" (Ruete)
33. Zeyane bint Said Sultan: the daughter of an Abyssinian woman (Ruete)
34. Semsem bint Said Sultan: full sister of Zeyâne, she was married "rather late in life [to] our distant cousin Humud" (Ruete)
35. Nunu bint Said Sultan: the daughter of a Circassian woman, she was born blind; after the deaths of her parents, she lived with her sister Aashe (Ruete)
36. Salme bint Said Sultan (1844–1924): later Emily Ruete
