= Slavery in Zanzibar =

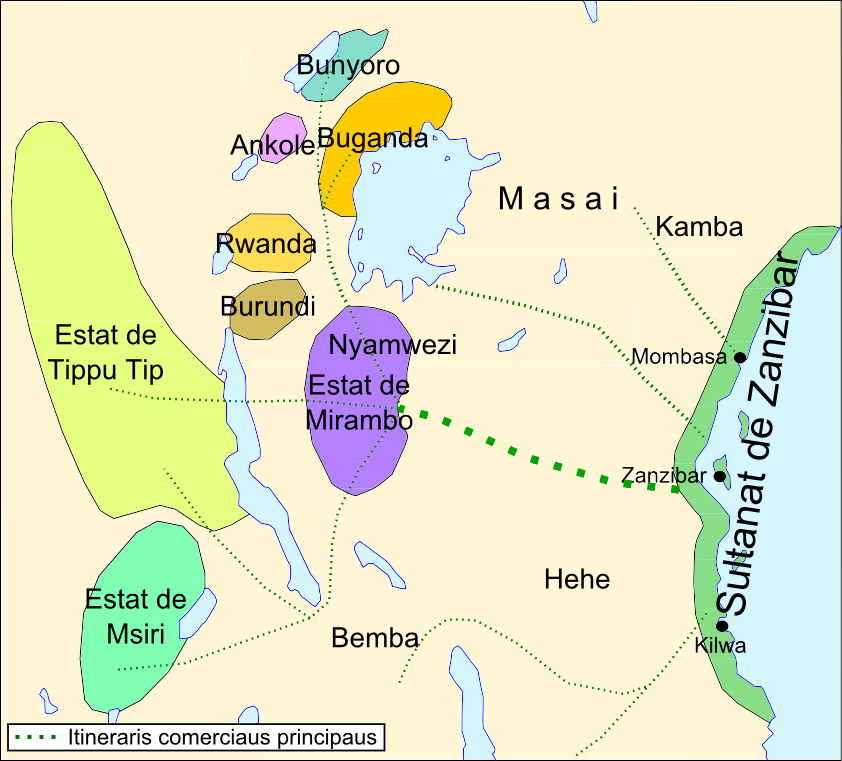
Sultanate of Zanzibar, 1875

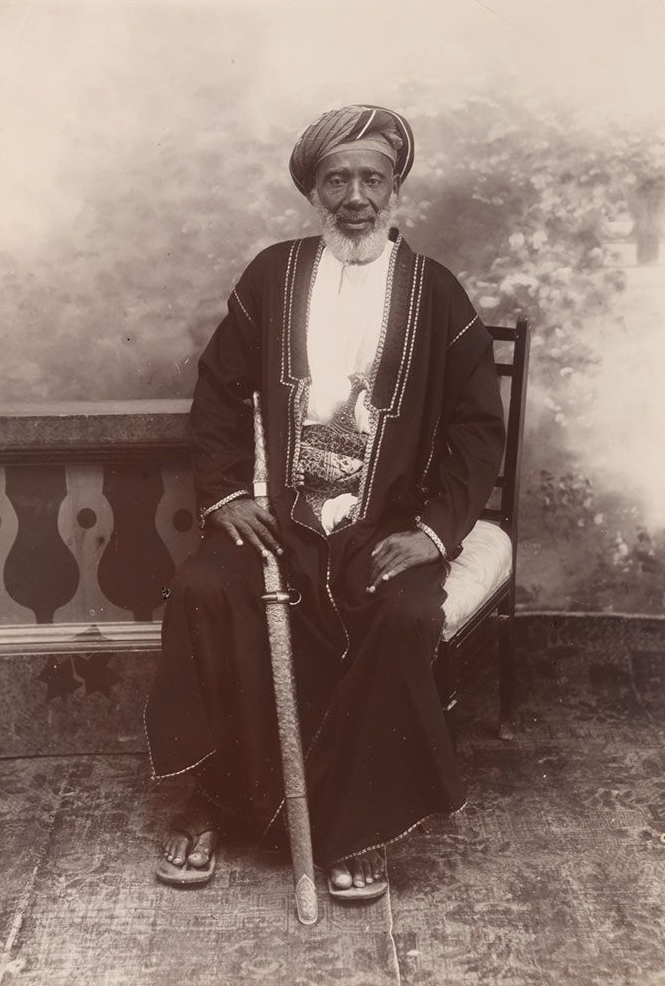
Tippu Tip

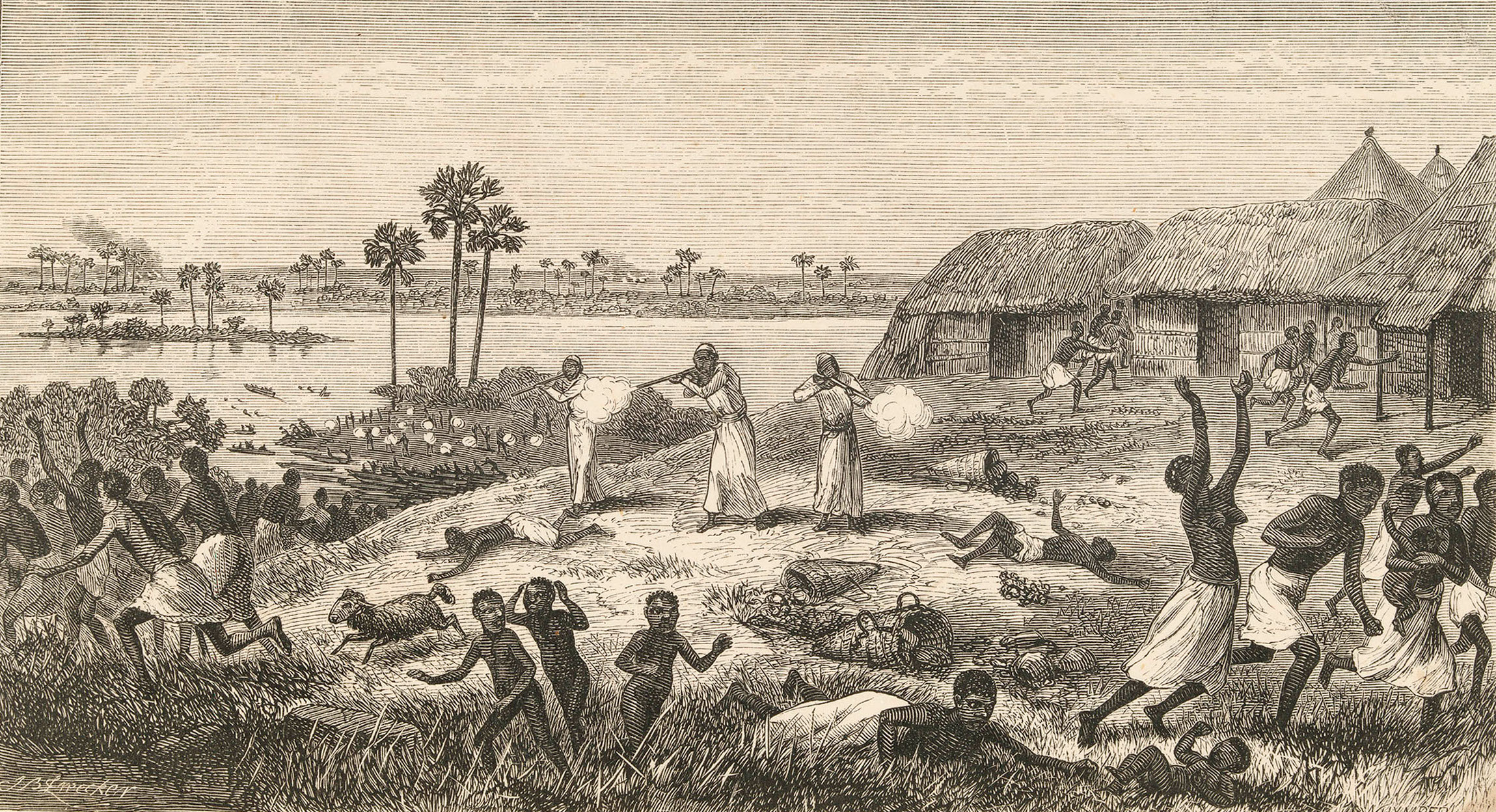
Arab slavers shooting at women at the market of Nyangwe during the massacre witnessed by David Livingstone in 1871

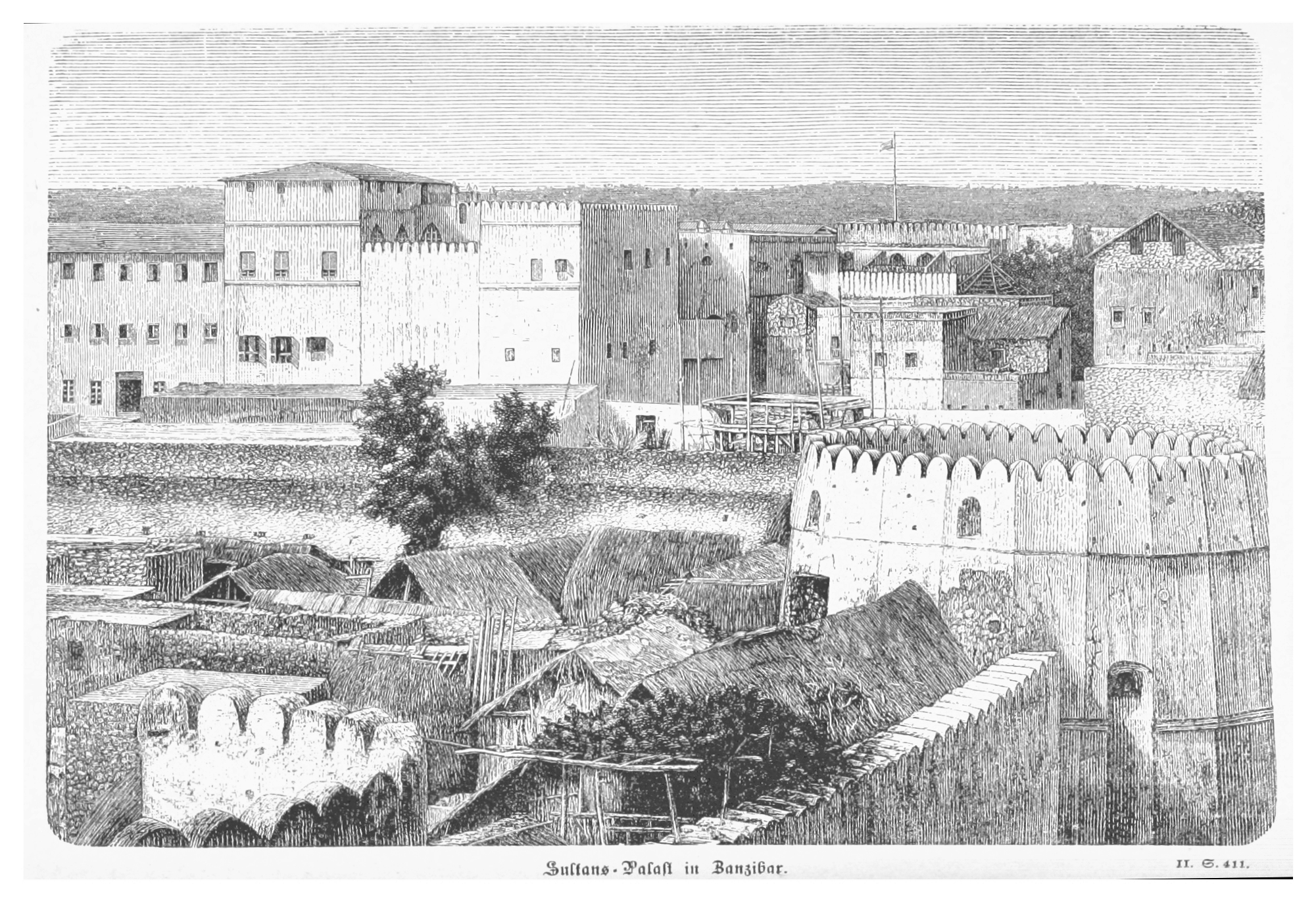
Sultan's palace, Zanzibar

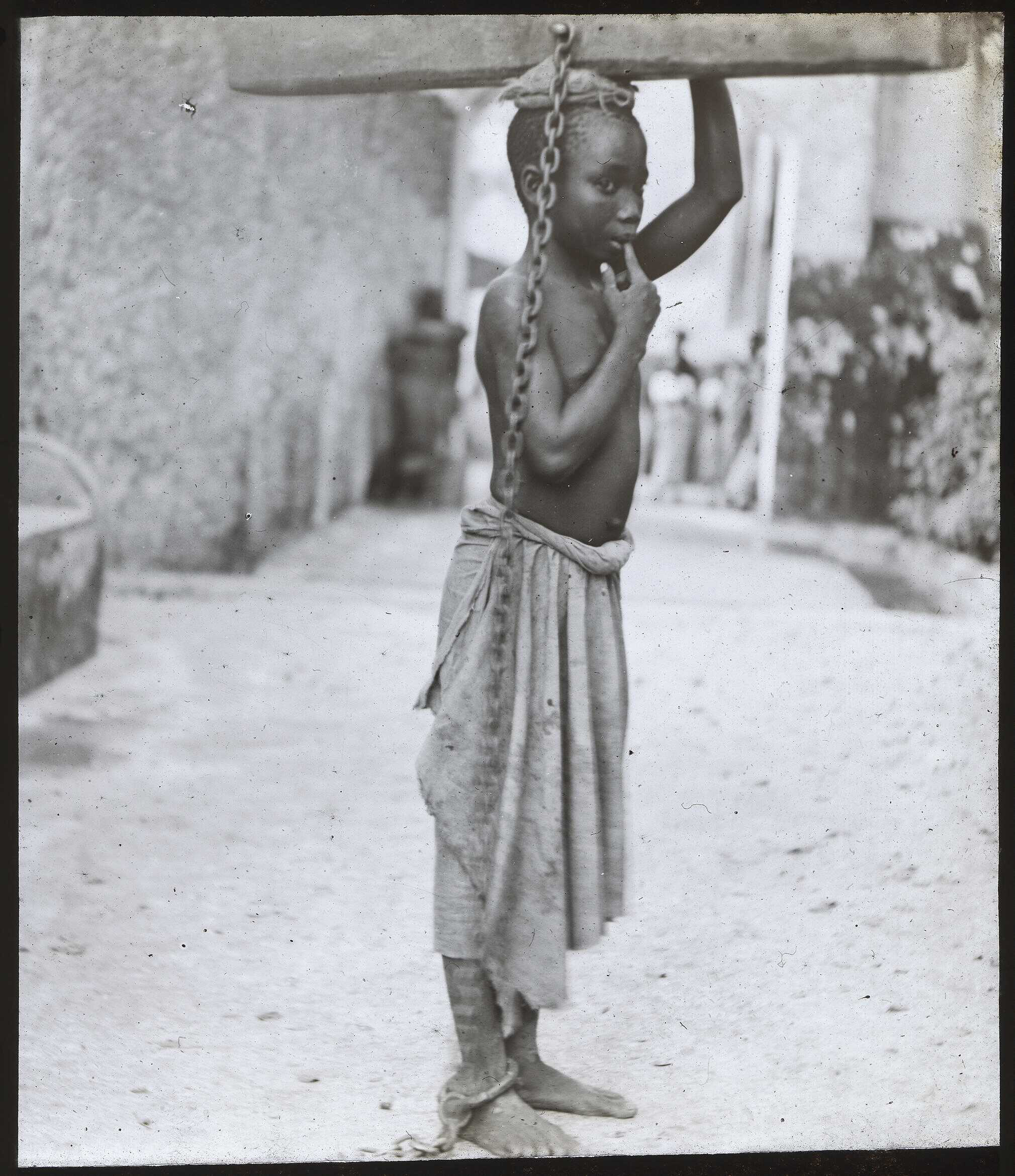
Slavery in Zanzibar

Slavery existed in the Sultanate of Zanzibar until 1909. Slavery and slave trade existed in the Zanzibar Archipelago for at least a thousand years. During the 19th century, the rise of large-scale clove and coconut plantations under Omani Arab rule led to a significant expansion of the slave system. By some estimates, enslaved people constituted up to two-thirds of the archipelago's population at its peak. Zanzibar was internationally known as a major player in the Indian Ocean slave trade, where slaves from the Swahili coast of Eastern Africa were trafficked across the Indian Ocean to Oman in the Arabian Peninsula during the Zanzibar slave trade.

During the 19th-century, Britain conducted an international abolitionist campaign against the Sultanate and restricted and eventually abolished the slavery and slave trade in Zanzibar via a number of treaties between 1822 and 1897, resulting in the end of the slave trade and finally the end of slavery itself in 1909.

== History ==
It is unknown when slave trade from Zanzibar started, and it may have existed also before the Arabs arrived in the area in the 8th century. During the Middle Ages, the Zanzibar Archipelago became a part of the Swahili culture and belonged to the Kilwa Sultanate, which was a center of the Indian Ocean slave trade between East Africa and the Arabian Peninsula during the Middle Ages, and the islands of the Zanzibar Archipelago are known to have traded in ivory and slaves long before it became a part of Oman.

In the 1690s, it finally became united with Oman in the Omani Empire (1696-1856).

== Zanzibar slave trade ==
The slave trade consisted of a third of the income to the Sultanate alongside ivory and cloves. The slave dhows were often rented of commercial ventures, and their crew a mix of Arab-Swaihili free men and slaves, with the profit divided via an owner-Captain-crew share system.

=== Northern slave route ===
Zanzibar was united with Oman in the Omani Empire (1696–1856), and the history of its slave trade was therefore intimately linked with the history of Oman. Slaves from the Swahili coast were transported via Zanzibar to Oman, and from Oman to Persia and the rest of the Arabian Peninsula and the Middle East. Together, Zanzibar and Oman dominated the Indian Ocean slave trade during the 18th- and 19th-century. This continued after the union between Zanzibar and Oman was broken in 1856 and the Sultanate was split in the Sultanate of Zanzibar (1856–1964) and the Sultanate of Muscat and Oman (1856–1970).

After the unification of Zanzibar and Oman, slaves became the biggest industry of Zanzibar alongside ivory and clove.

The Arabian slaveships, dhow, were normally rented or were a part of a commercial enterprise, with an Arab and Swaihili crew, partially or fully enslaved, in which the profit was shared between the owner, the captain and the crew (the enslaved crew members having to give half of their salary to their enslaver).

The numbers of the slave traffic is not known, but one estimation is that about 2250 slaves were trafficked between Zanzibar and the Arabian Peninsula between 1700 and 1815.

After 1867, the British campaign against the Indian Ocean slave trade was undermined by Omani slave dhows using French colors trafficking slaves to Arabia and the Persian Gulf from East Africa as far South as Mozambique, which the French tolerated until 1905, when the Hague International Tribunal mandated France to curtail French flags to Omani dhows; nevertheless, small scale smuggling of slaves from East Africa to Arabia continued until the 1960s.

=== Southern slave route ===
The French islands in the Indian Ocean initially imported their slaves from Portuguese Mozambique and from Madagascar, but in 1775 the first French slave trader visited Zanzibar and acquired 1625 slaves during his first two visits, which opened the "Southern route" from Zanzibar to French Mauritius, Réunion and Seychelles.

Mauritius and Seychelles became British colonies in 1815, and the British ended the legal slave trade to those islands. In 1848, France abolished slavery on French Réunion.

== Slave market ==
The slaves in Zanzibar were categorized as plantation laborers (shamba), house slaves, concubines (suria), craftsmen, coolies (wachukuzi) and day laborers (vibarua).

After introduction of a plantation economy, slaves were no longer merely exported via Zanzibar but the import of slaves to the Sultanate expanded because of the need for slave laborers for weeding, picking, drying and stemming on the clove and coconut plantations.

Slaves were affordable in Zanzibar, and every free man in Zanzibar was said to own slaves. In the 1850s, two thirds of the population on Zanzibar are estimated to have been slaves.

Female slaves were generally more prioritized in the slave market in the Islamic world. The Zanzibar slave trade focused on children "the reason given by the dealers being that children were driven more easily, like flocks of sheep...", and particularly girls; while a "fresh boy" newly arrived from the mainland was sold for a price of 7-$15 in 1857, a girl between the age of seven and eight was sold for 10-$18 .

=== Female slaves ===
The slave market for women in the Sultanate followed the normal pattern in the Islamic world. Female slaves were sold for use as either domestic servants (ayahs) or for sex slavery as concubines.

Aside from the female slaves used as concubines in private harems, female slaves were also used for prostitution. While there were male prostitutes, there were very few or no free female prostitutes in Zanzibar. The Islamic Law formally prohibited prostitution. However, since Islamic Law allowed a man to have sexual intercourse with his female slave, prostitution was practiced by a pimp selling his female slave on the slave market to a client, who returned his ownership of her after 1–2 days on the pretext of discontent after having had intercourse with her, which was a legal and accepted method for prostitution in the Islamic world.

In 1844 the British Consul noted that there were 400 free Arab women and 800 men in Zanzibar, and the British noted that while prostitutes were almost nonexistent, men bought "secondary wives" (slave concubines) on the slave market for sexual satisfaction; "public prostitutes are few, and the profession ranks low where the classes upon which it depends can easily afford to gratify their propensities in the slave market", and the US Consul Richard Waters commented in 1837 that the Arab men in Zanzibar "commit adultery and fornication by keep three or four and sometimes six and eight concubines". Sultan Seyyid Said replied to the British Consul that the custom was necessary, because "Arabs won't work; they must have slaves and concubines".

The concubines were often treated harshly by the wives of their enslavers, who were claimed to have "[ruled] the concubines with a rod of iron". Sultan Barghash (r. 1870–1888) was only married to one wife, who made him the request to never acknowledging the children he had with his slave concubines as his own (meaning the women did not become umm walad and were not free after the death of their enslaver).

In his contemporary report A Report on Slavery and the Slave Trade in Zanzibar, Pemba, and the Mainland of the British Protectorates of East Africa from 1895, Donald MacKenzie noted that sexual slavery did not, in fact, result in many children, which necessitated the need for constant slave import:

"It is a curious fact that Slaves have but very few children, owing, it is said, to the manner in which very young girls are treated by the Arabs and others; hence the necessity for the continued importation of raw Slaves to supply the demand. I was much struck with the evidence of non-increase amongst the Slaves as regards children. Taking the death-rate at 30 per mille, upwards of 7,000 Slaves would have to be imported annually to supply this deficiency in labour."

=== Royal harem ===
The model of the royal harem of Zanzibar were similar to most royal harems at the time. Enslaved eunuchs were employed to guard and manage the affairs of the harem, while female slave maids were employed to see to the needs of the slave concubines, the wives and the female relatives.

The memoirs of Princess Emily Ruete provides valuable insight and description of the royal harem. Sultan Seyyid Said had three legal wives, but despite all his marriages being childless, he nevertheless had 36 children, who must thus have been born to slave concubines. The concubines were referred to as sarari or suria, and could be of several different ethnicities, often Ethiopian or Circassian. Ethiopian, Indian or Circassian (white) women were much more expensive than the majority of African women sold in the slave market in Zanzibar, and white women in particular were so expensive that they were in practice almost reserved for the royal harem. White slave women were called jariyeh bayza and imported to Oman and Zanzibar via Persia (Iran) and it was said that a white slave girl "soon renders the house of a moderately rich man unendurable". The white slave women were generally referred to as "Circassian", but this was a general term and did not specifically refer to Circassian ethnicity as such but could refer to any white women, such as Georgian or Bulgarian. Emily Ruete referred to all white women in the royal harem as "Circassian" as a general term, one of whom was her own mother Jilfidan, who had arrived via the Circassian slave trade to become a concubine at the royal harem as a child. When the sultan Said bin Sultan died in 1856, he had 75 enslaved sararai-concubines in his harem.

In 19th century Zanzibar, Oromo slave girls were also greatly valued and were bought by the Sultans for their harem. Johann Ludwig Krapf noted that the Oromo slave girls sold at Somali ports were in great demand in the Swahili coast and sold for up to a hundred dollars, often ending up in the harems of prominent people. According to Henry Morton Stanley, Sultan Barghash bin Said imported Circassian, Georgian and Oromo slave-girls, as well as women from other regional sources.

Emily Ruete described the multi ethnic Royal harem in her memoirs:

Arabic was the only language really sanctioned in my father's presence. But as soon as he turned his back, a truly Babylonian confusion of tongues commenced, and Arabian, Persian, Turkish, Circassian, Swahely, Nubian, and Abyssinian were spoken and mixed up together, not to mention the various dialects of these tongues. [...] Both at Bet il Mtoni and at Bet il Sahel the meals were cooked in the Arab as well as in the Persian and Turkish manner. People of all races lived in these two houses — the races of various beauty. The slaves were dressed in Swaihily style, but we were permitted to appear in Arab fashion alone. Any newly-arrived Circassian or Abyssinian woman had to exchange her ample robes and fantastic attire within three days for -the Arab costume provided for her. [...] On the seventh day after the birth of a child my father used to' pay a visit to the infant and its mother to present some article of jewellery to the baby. In the same way a new Surie received at onco the necessary jewels, and had her servants assigned to her by the chief eunuch."

=== Male slaves ===
While most enslaved women, eunuchs and children were used in urban households as domestics or concubines (sex slaves), only a minority of non-castrated male slaves were used in the city as craftsmen or porters (hamalis). The majority of non-castrated male slaves were instead used for hard slave labor in the clove and coconut-plantations.

In 1828 the sultan ordered his (Arab) subjects on Zanzibar to grow a certain proportion of clove; and since the original inhabitants of the islands, the shirazi, had converted to Islam and was therefore not legitimate to enslave, the growing clove industry resulted in a big import of slave labor. The sultan's order resulted in a plantation economy centered on clove and coconut plantations on particularly Unguja, Pemba and the mainland of the Sultanate, which resulted in a booming slave import for domestic use in the Archipelago, from which most slaves had previously been sold on rather than kept on the islands.

While Black Africans were not the only ethnicity enslaved, there was a particular racism toward them among Arabs. Black African slaves were referred to as ugly and uncivilised washenzi ("barbaric savages"), and while female Africah slaves were sexually abused by male Arab slave masters, the Arab text Alf Laylah Wa Laylah described how "the good [Arab] woman will welcome death rather than be touched by a black man".

Slavery in Zanzibar was known to be hard, with slaves often subjected to bad treatment. Slaves were often forced to convert to Islam. Many enslavers had a reputation of being cruel slave owners, particularly plantation owners, such as Princess Khole; the Hinaway family had 600 slaves on their plantations and was known to treat their slaves harshly; caught ranaways were punished by being placed in the Mapinguni (the place of shackles), Mgooni (the fish trap) or Mashimoni (the pits). Manumissions normally took place at the deathbed of an enslaver who wished to be given a reward for it in the afterlife, but was otherwise rare; slaves often attempted to escape, particularly from the plantations, and often died from the punishment when caught.

== Activism against slavery and slave trade ==
=== Early efforts ===
The British restricted the Zanzibar slave trade by a number of treaties from 1822. In the Moresby Treaty of 1822, the Zanzibar slave trade was prohibited from the South and East, and by the Hammerton Treaty of 1845, it was restricted to the north as well.

The Hammerton Treaty of 1845 with the British restricted slave trade to be legal only within the territory of Zanzibar, but Zanzibar continued to import slaves from Kilwa in the East African coast to Madagascar and the Comoros with official papers for a legal slave trade north.

In an 1867 agreement with the British, Zanzibar was pressured to ban the export of slaves to Arabia, and to limit the slave trade within the borders of the Sultanate to only between Latitude 9 degrees South of Kilwa, and Latitude 4 degrees South of Lamu.

=== 1873 treaty ===
In 1872, Henry Bartle Frere was sent to Zanzibar to negotiate an end to the slave trade. In the 1873 Frere treaty with the British, Sultan Turki signed a treaty that obliged Zanzibar to end the import of slaves from the mainland to the islands. This included "slaves who were destined for transport from one part of the Sultan's dominion to another, or using his land for passing them to foreign dominions. Anyone found involved in this traffic would be liable to detention and condemnation by all [British] Naval Officers and Agents, and all slaves entering the Sultan's dominions should be freed." In practice, however, the slave trade continued, though at a reduced level.

After the Frere treaty, the British navy patrolled the Sea between the East African mainland and the Zanzibar Archipelago to stop the slave trafficking between the mainland and the archipelago. The Frere treaty did not stop the slave trade, which continued as illegal smuggling.

After 1873 slaves were given the right to apply for help from the British if they were about to be sold against their will.

The open slave market in Stone Town was closed after the 1873 prohibition, and the illegal slave smuggling was centered on the more isolated island of Pemba. The Sultanate still imported 10,000 slaves every month in 1875, and there were skirmishes at sea between Arab slave dhows and the British navy. In the treaty with the British of 1873, Zanzibar was forced to ban the import of slaves to Zanzibar itself from the Zanzibar mainland. However the slave trade continued illegally, and now often in the form of the kidnapping of slaves from slave owners on the mainland, and a British official in Lamu noted in 1884-85 that "slave stealers, of whom there are plenty in the area", stole slaves from the Arab slave traders to smuggle them to Zanzibar and Pemba.

When the slave trade from Zanzibar to the Arabian peninsula was banned, the slaves captured by Zanzibari slave traders in East Africa were no longer transported from the Swahili coast to the Arabian peninsula on sea via Zanzibar due to the naval blockade, but instead forced to walk by land to Somalia, from which they could enter the slave dhows to Arabia away from British eyes. Most of the Bantu living in southern Somalia are descendants of Bantus who were enslaved by the Sultanate of Zanzibar in the 18th century. From 1800 to 1890, between 25,000 and 50,000 Bantu slaves are thought to have been sold from the slave markets of Zanzibar to the Somali coast.

=== 1890 decree ===
After British pressure, in 1890 the sultan of Zanzibar issued a decree that "the exchange sale or purchase of slaves - domestic or otherwise is prohibited"; banned the buying and selling of slaves within the borders of Zanzibar, and inheriting slaves from any other than the children of a slave owner; slavery as such was not banned, but existing slaves were given the right to buy their freedom, and the children of slaves born after 1890 were to be born free. When the Vice Consul attempted to enforce the 1890 decree on Pemba in 1895, it was met with intense protest.

Elite Arabs and European businessmen protested the decree and within a year, it was virtually ignored as a legal document.

The British authorities were somewhat reluctant to interfere against slavery on Zanzibar too soon because of their concern for local economy, and Sir John Kirk noted that "slavery... is essential to prosperity in Pemba", but the British were put under pressure from British missionaries and the British public. The British Friends Anti-Slavery Committee launched a campaign in newspapers such as Times London to put pressure on the British government to force Zanzibar to finally ban slavery, which put the British under pressure from home to act against Zanzibar.

=== Abolition and aftermath ===
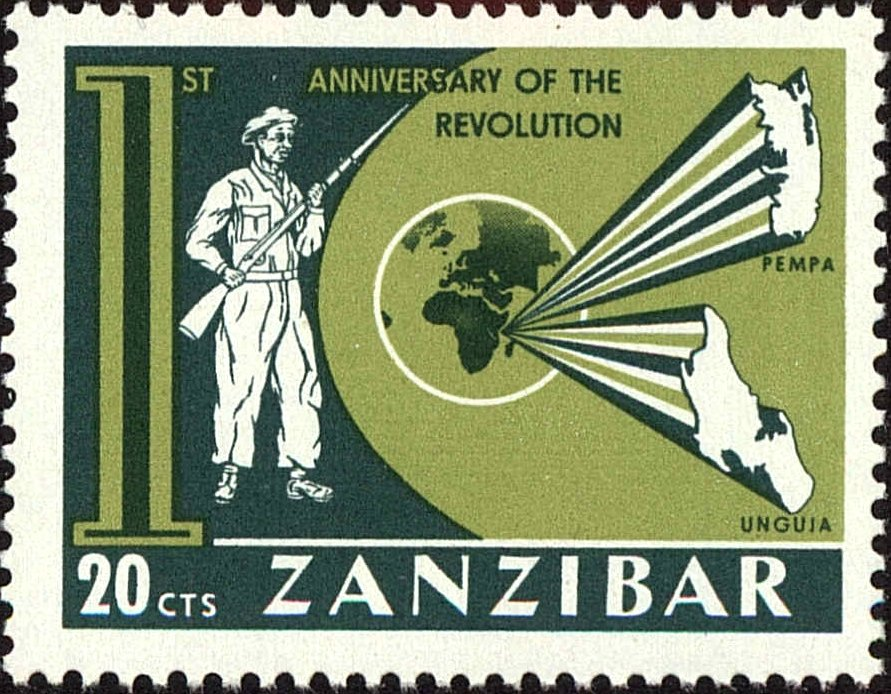
Stamp of Zanzibar - 1965 - Colnect 413541 - Soldier and map

In 1897 the British forced the Sultan to abolish slavery in Zanzibar by declaring that it lacked legal status.

After abolition, the Slavery Commissioners Court was founded, staffed with British officials, to receive and enforce the manumission applications of the former slaves. 12.000 slaves applied for freedom on Unguja and Pemba between 1897 and 1909, 55-63 of whom were women, but they were a minority of the slaves.

In 1897, most of the inhabitants on Pemba were unaware even of the 1890 decree and opposed the enforcement of abolition on the island; Emily Keys noted in 1898 that French missionaries had been threatened by the Arab Pemba elite "who were threatening to shoot all newcomers to the island".

The slave owners on Zanzibar attempted, often successfully, to prevent their slaves from being aware of the abolition of slavery, and ship them abroad to sell them in Muscat, Jeddah and Mecca; in April 1898, the British stopped an Arab boat in which a rich Arab male passenger had brought with him 36 male and female servants to sell in Arabia; the servants informed the British that they had been bribed in order to accompany him there.

The 1897 decree has been referred to as the abolition of slavery on Zanzibar, however, it was in fact not the abolition of all slaves, since concubines (sex slaves) were explicitly excluded from abolition. The British viewed the question of the concubines as too sensitive to meddle in, and decided to exclude them from manumission. The Muslim owners of slave concubines pointed out to the British officials that single women would not be able to support themselves and were likely to become prostitutes if they were manumitted. The British excluded the concubines by officially classifying them as wives rather than slaves, but gave them the right to apply for manumission on the grounds of cruelty and abuse from their enslaver.

In 1909, the British finally forced the sultan to include the concubines in the abolition, which signified the final and actual abolition of slavery in Zanzibar. After 1909 the former slaves continued to work for their former enslavers in exchange for patronage and the right to continue to live on the land of their enslavers.

The slave trade from Zanzibar to the Arabian peninsula continued after the official abolition of the slave trade. As late as in the Interwar period after the end of the WWI, Arab men from Zanzibar brought with them large retinues of African servants to the Hajj pilgrimage, and sold them on the slave market in Jeddah on arrival; shortly after the end of the war in 1918, the British was informed about one such case when an Arab man had brought with him a dozen young female servants on his Hajj pilgrimage, and sold them to merchants in Mecca and Medina. The British noted that the Arab slave owners in Zanzibar regarded their former slaves as still slaves, who continued to work for them and who were still sold by them in Jeddah, Mecca and Medina:

"it seems this was a common practice among wealthy former slave owners who, after 1897, employed their former slaves at minimal wages and continued to consider them as slaves, and the only way of selling them abroad appears to have been the pretext of going to Mecca where their "wathumish" (servants) were sold away as Khadims".

A small scale slave trade is believed to have continued as late as the 1960s. The tensions and consequences of the slavery and slave trade on Zanzibar influenced the area a long time, and contributed to the Zanzibar Revolution in the 1960s.

== Gallery ==
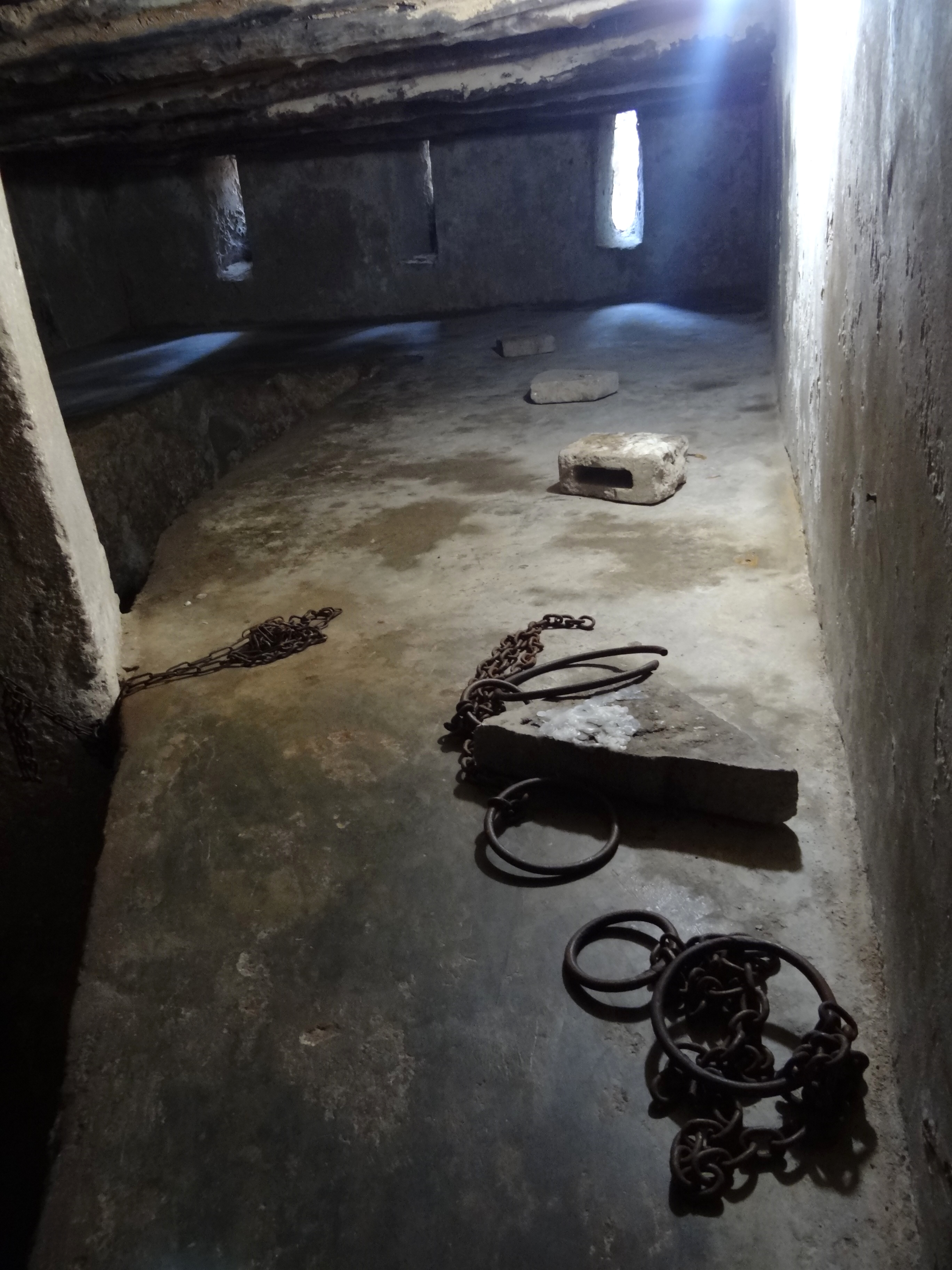
Slave holding cell with manacles.

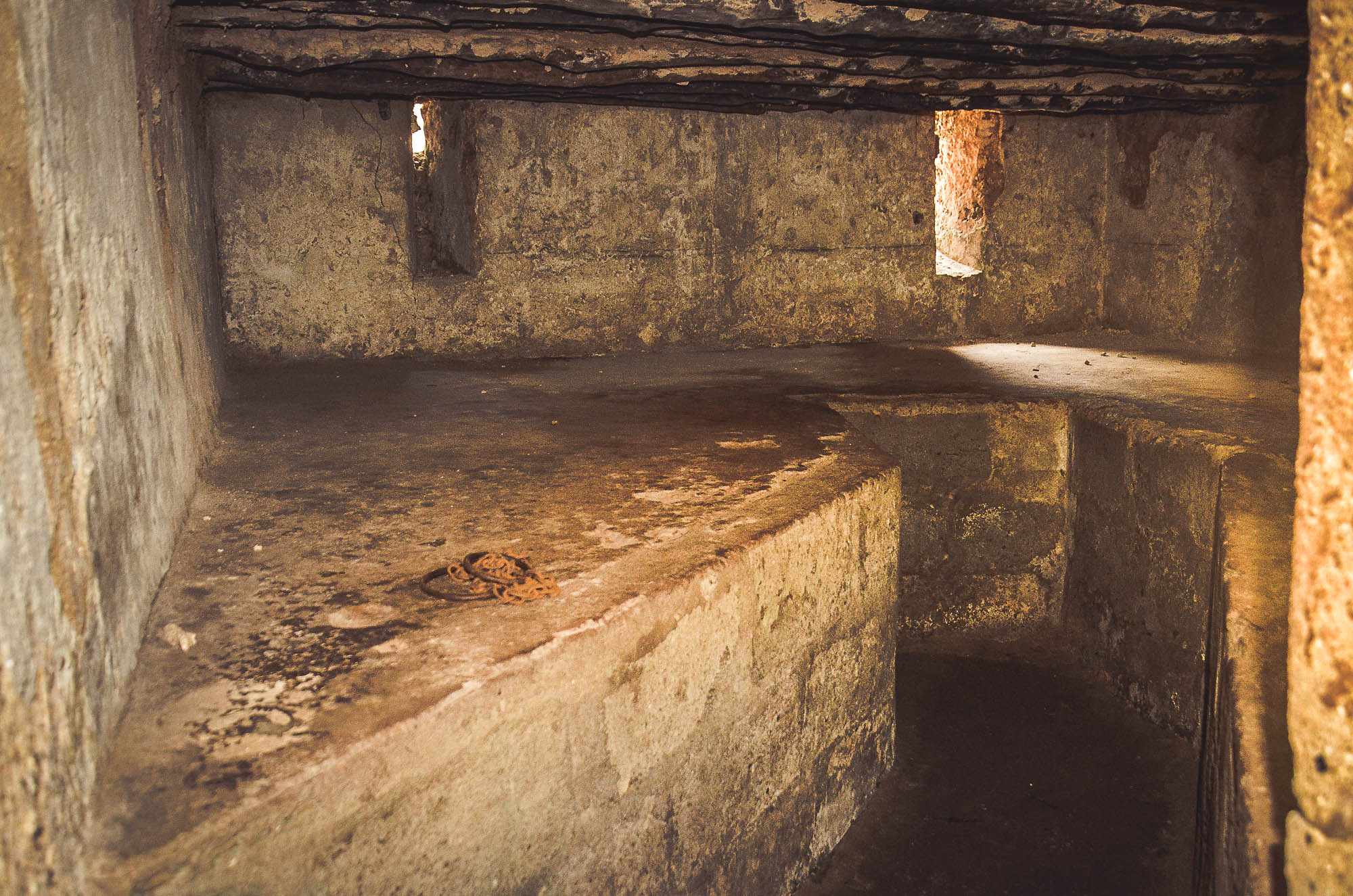
A site of the former slave market in Mkunazini area.

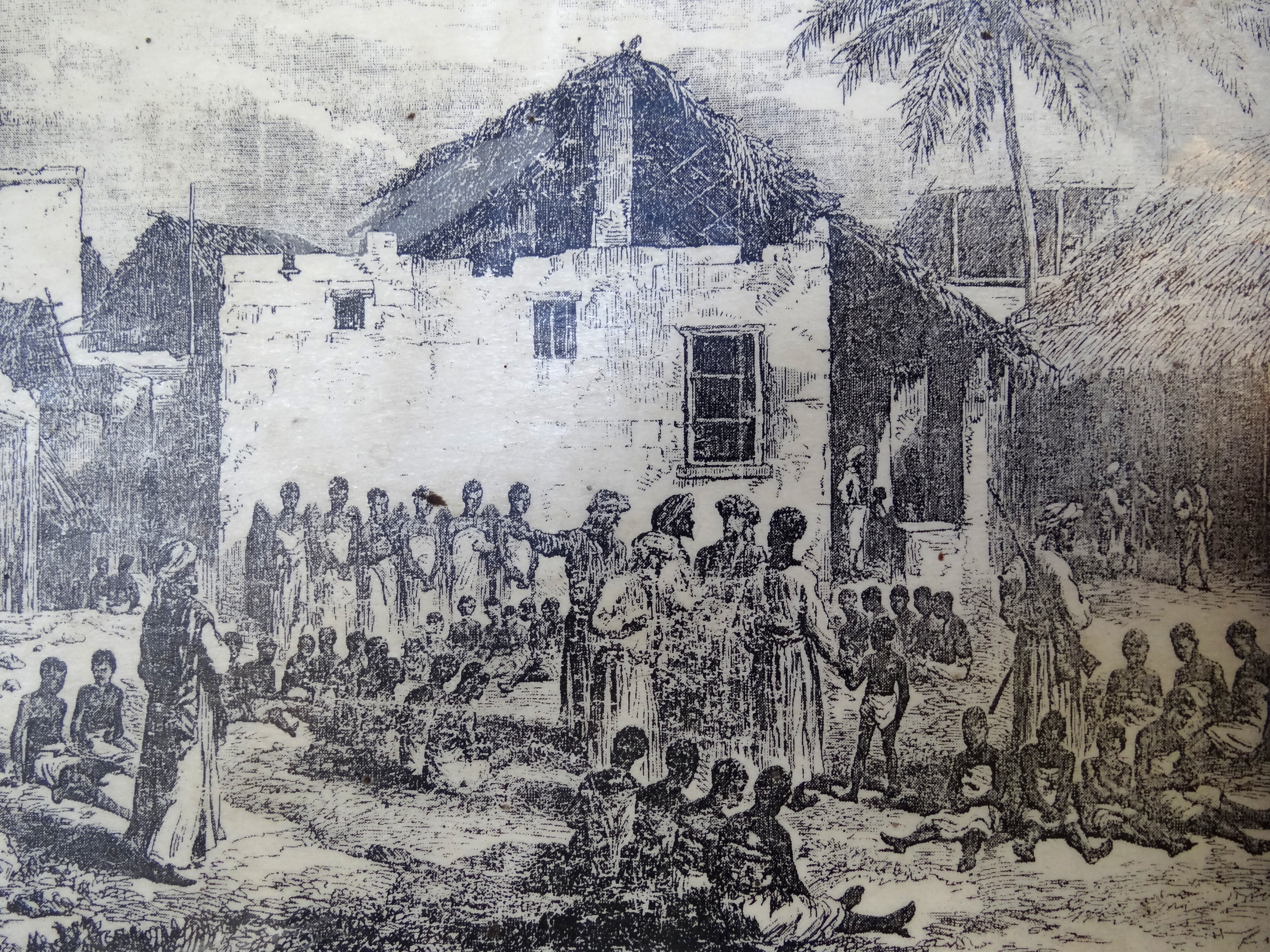
Contemporary engraving of Zanzibar slave market.

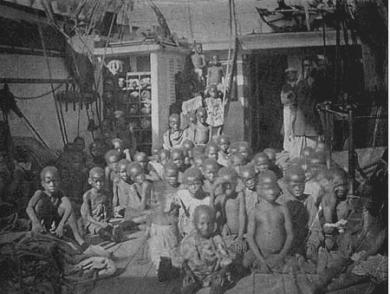
Slave boat, 1869

== See also ==
- Belgian Anti-Slavery Society
- Baqt
- Red Sea slave trade
- Indian Ocean slave trade
- Comoros slave trade
- History of slavery in the Muslim world
- History of concubinage in the Muslim world
- Human trafficking in the Middle East
