= Orders, decorations, and medals of the Sultanate of Zanzibar =

Honors system established in Zanzibar

The orders, decorations, and medals of the Sultanate of Zanzibar the honors system established in Zanzibar prior to the Zanzibar Revolution of 1964. Sultan Majid bin Said of Zanzibar established the first Zanzibari order in 1865. Subsequent sultans expanded the honors system.

== Orders ==
- Order of the Brilliant Star of Zanzibar
- Order of the Exalted
- Order of the Praiseworthy
- Order of Independence
- Order of Hamondieh

== Medals and other decorations ==
- Zanzibar General Service Medal
- Sultan of Zanzibar's Silver Jubilee Medal
- Sultan of Zanzibar's Coronation Medal

== See also ==
- Orders, decorations, and medals of Tanzania
- Orders, decorations, and medals of Oman
- Sultanate of Zanzibar
- Zanzibar Revolution
