= Order of the Brilliant Star =

Order of the Brilliant Star may refer to:

- Order of the Brilliant Star of Zanzibar
- Order of Brilliant Star (Taiwan)
