= Lovell Augustus Reeve =

British biologist and publisher

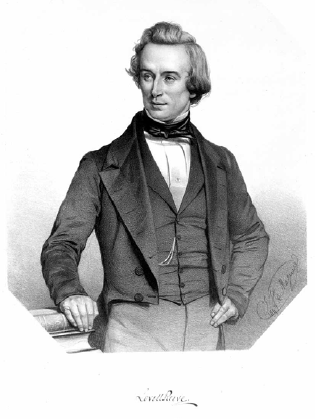
- Born: 19 April 1814; Ludgate Hill, London
- Died: 18 November 1865 (aged 51); Covent Garden, London

Lovell Augustus Reeve (19 April 1814 – 18 November 1865) was an English conchologist and publisher.

== Life ==
Born at Ludgate Hill, London, on 19 April 1814, he was the son of Thomas Reeve, draper and mercer, and Fanny Reeve, née Lovell. After attending school at Stockwell, he was apprenticed at the age of 13 to Mr. Graham, a local grocer. The chance purchase of shells led to a lifelong interest in conchology. In 1833 he attended the meeting of the British Association for the Advancement of Science at Cambridge. At the end of his apprenticeship Reeve visited Paris, where he read a paper on the classification of Mollusca before the Academy of Sciences. On his return to London, he wrote his first book, Conchologia Systematica (2 vols. London, 1841–2).

From 1842, he traded as a natural history dealer. Using profits made by the sale of Dutch Governor-General of the Moluccas Van Ryder's collection from the Moluccas, which he purchased at Rotterdam, and with the help of friends, he opened a shop in King William Street, Strand, London.

He was elected a fellow of the Linnean Society in 1846 and of the Geological Society in 1853, and he was an honorary member of foreign scientific societies. From 1850 to 1856 he was editor and proprietor of the Literary Gazette. Around 1848 he moved to Henrietta Street, Covent Garden; and though he subsequently lived elsewhere around London, he returned to live at his place of business in 1864.

Reeve died at Covent Garden, 18 November 1865, and was buried at West Norwood Cemetery. The firm he had started continued publishing between 1858 and 1980, later under the name of 'L. Reeve & Co.'

== Bibliography ==
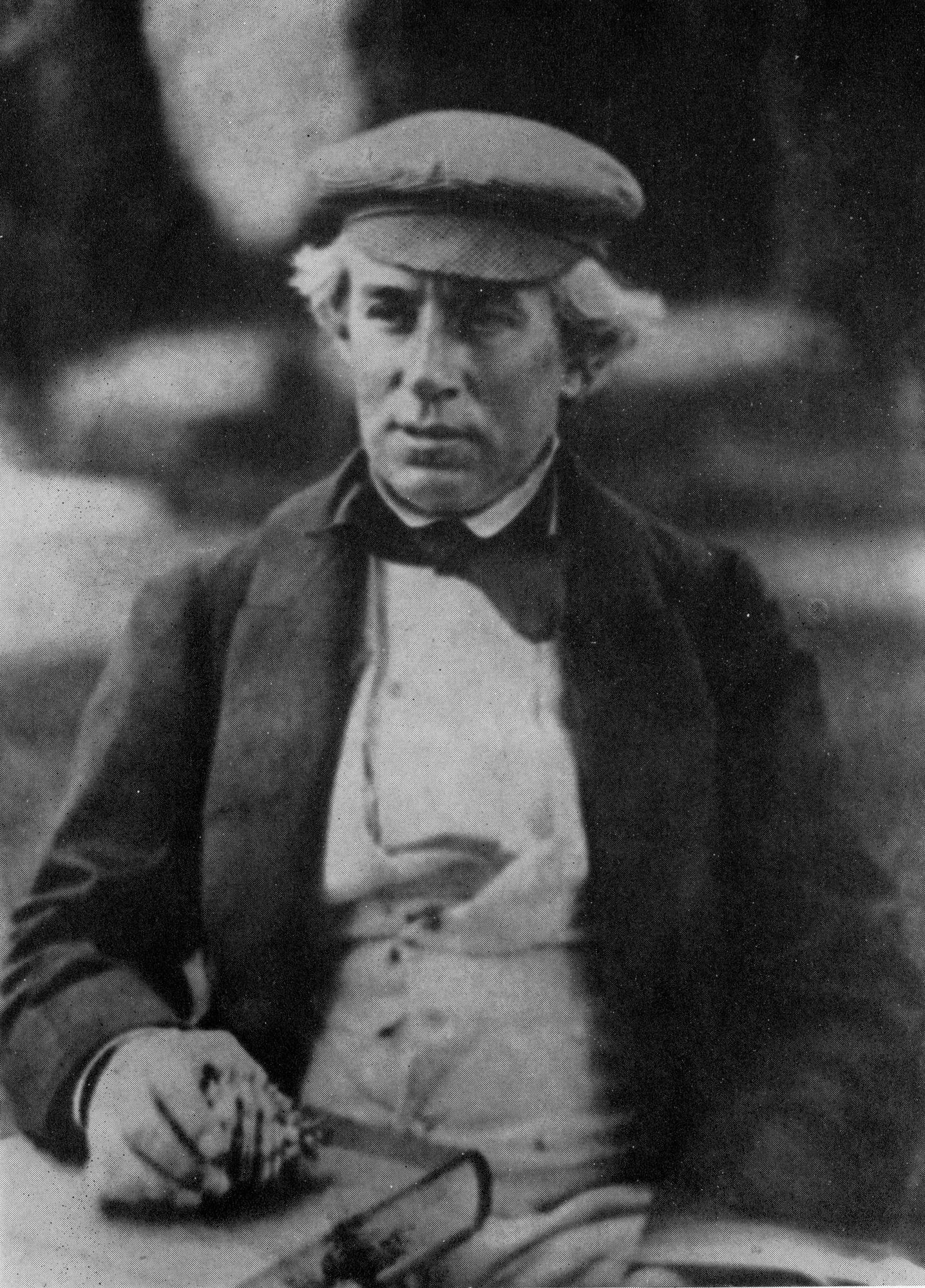
Lovell Augustus Reeve

Reeve was the author of many publications on mollusc shells, the best known of which is Conchologia iconica, or, Illustrations of the shells of molluscous animals, which spanned 20 volumes and contained about 27,000 figures.

- Conchologia iconica, or, Illustrations of the shells of molluscous animals. London.
  - (1843) Volume 1.

He also published books by other authors:

- Jane Wallas Penfold (1845) Madeira: Flowers, Fruits and Ferns
- George Brettingham Sowerby II (1854) Popular British conchology : A familiar history of the molluscs inhabiting the British Isles
- Thomas Moore (1855) A Popular History of the British Ferns and the Allied Plants
- W. Lauder Lindsay (1856) A popular history of British lichens : comprising an account of their structure, reproduction, uses, distribution, and classification (xxxii + 352 p.)
