= Arthur Raikes =

British army officer

Brigadier-General Arthur Raikes
- Arthur Raikes (right) with Sultan Ali Bin Hamud
- Born: Arthur Edward Harington Raikes; 5 February 1867; England
- Died: 3 March 1915 (aged 48); Kensington Court Gardens, London, England
- Occupation: Army Officer
- Spouse: Geraldine Arbuthnot (m. 1899; died 1915)
- Relatives: Sir Robert Arbuthnot, 2nd Baronet (grandfather); Walter Clutterbuck (nephew)

Arthur Edward Harington Raikes (5 February 1867 – 3 March 1915) was a British army officer who served as acting prime minister, vizier and first minister to numerous Sultans of Zanzibar. Serving in the Wiltshire Regiment Raikes took up a position as brigadier-general in Zanzibar's army and fought on the pro-British side in the Anglo-Zanzibar War. He also helped to negotiate the demarcation of the boundary between Zanzibari and British territory on the African mainland. Raikes was awarded honours by several nations in the course of his work.

== Early life ==
Raikes was born on 5 February 1867 to Reverend Charles Hall Raikes and Charlotte d'Ende Arbuthnot. Through his sister Madeline, the wife of Edmund Henry Clutterbuck, he was uncle to Walter Clutterbuck.

His maternal grandparents were Sir Robert Arbuthnot, 2nd Baronet and the former Anne Fitzgerald (a daughter of Field Marshal Sir John Forster FitzGerald).

Raikes was an officer in the Wiltshire Regiment, being commissioned a second lieutenant on 10 November 1888 and a lieutenant on 24 November 1890.

== Career ==
Raikes moved to the Sultanate of Zanzibar to take up an appointment as Brigadier-General in the Sultan's army. In 1896 he was involved in the Anglo-Zanzibar War, caused by the succession of a sultan unfavourable to the British, and led 900 pro-British Askaris during the bombardment of the Sultan's palace. In return for his service he was appointed a First Class (Second Grade) member of the Order of the Brilliant Star of Zanzibar on 24 September 1896, a First Class member of the Zanzibari Order of Hamondieh on 25 August 1897 and later promoted to Commander of the Zanzibari armies.

=== Politician in Zanzibar ===
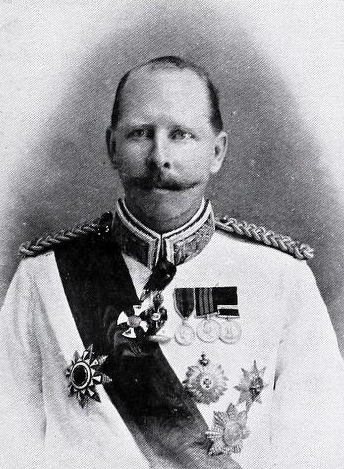

Raikes was acting prime minister of Zanzibar by 1898 when he was involved in a diplomatic incident with France. The Zanzibari police had caught a slave trader in the act of exporting slaves from Pemba and he had been arrested. However, despite claims he was a native of Pemba, he claimed French nationality as a native of the Comoros islands and flew a French flag from his dhow. Raikes returned the flag to M. Laronce the French consul and, in court with the Arab caid, pronounced a sentence of one years imprisonment on the slaver. The British consul Arthur Henry Hardinge pronounced that the likelihood was that the slaver was born in Pemba and even if from the Comoros his birth would have preceded the declaration of the French protectorate. In 1899 Raikes, on behalf of the Zanzibari sultan, accepted the line of demarcation proposed by Hardinge between British and Zanzibari possessions on the African mainland, this crossing the line of the Uganda Railway.

By 1902, Raikes had been promoted to captain of the Wiltshire Regiment. He accompanied Sultan Ali bin Hamud of Zanzibar on his visit to Britain for the coronation of King Edward VII. On 6 November 1903 Raikes was granted approval to accept and wear the Cross of a Commander of the Order of Franz Joseph awarded to him by Francis Joseph I of Austria when he visited Zanzibar on board SMS Zenta. On 26 July 1905 he was given approval to accept and wear the insignia of a Knight Commander of the Order of Christ, awarded to him by King Carlos I of Portugal in return for valuable services. On 12 July 1906, Raikes was appointed a First Class Member of the Order of El Aliyeh for services rendered to the Sultan of Zanzibar.

Raikes served as Vizier to Zanzibar from 1906 until 1908 and was, at one stage, first minister to the country.

== Personal life ==
On 16 December 1899, Raikes married Geraldine Arbuthnot (c. 1870–1920), with whom he had one son.

Raikes died on 3 March 1915 at number 28 Kensington Court Gardens, London.

== Bibliography ==
- Hernon, Ian (2003), Britain's Forgotten Wars, Stroud, Gloucestershire: Sutton Publishing, ISBN 0-7509-3162-0.
