= John Houston Sinclair =

British civil servant (1871–1961)

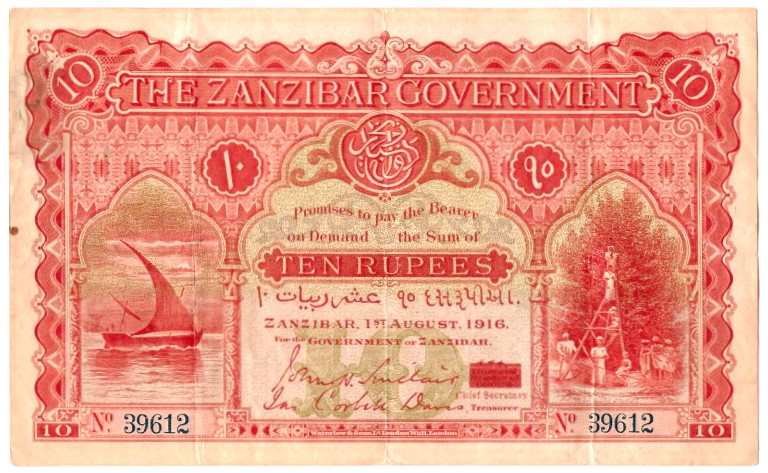
A Zanzibar 10 Rupees banknote of 1916 signed by Sinclair.

John Houston Sinclair CMG CBE (1871 – 17 August 1961) was the British Resident civil servant in Zanzibar and chief secretary to the Government of the Zanzibar Protectorate.

== Early life and family ==
John Houston Sinclair was born in 1871, the son of William Houston Sinclair. He married Muriel Cockburn on 29 April 1902 and they had a daughter, Katherine Theodosia Sinclair (died 2001).

== Career ==
Sinclair held various official posts in Zanzibar (1899-1924), rising to become British Resident and chief secretary to the Government of the Zanzibar Protectorate.

He played a pivotal role in the creation of Zanzibar Stone Town.

On his retirement as British Resident at Zanzibar, Sinclair was conferred with the Order of the Brilliant Star of Zanzibar (first class) by the Sultan of Zanzibar.

== Later life ==
In later life, Sinclair lived in Tangier, Morocco. He died on 17 August 1961. His reminiscences of his life in England, Kenya, Zanzibar and Tangier, Senex Africanus in 177 pages, are held by Cambridge University Library and the Royal Commonwealth Society Library.
