= Valerie Eliot =

British editor; widow of T. S. Eliot

- Born: Esmé Valerie Fletcher; 17 August 1926
- Died: 9 November 2012 (aged 86); London, England
- Occupations: Secretary, editor, literary executor
- Spouse: T. S. Eliot (m. 1957; died 1965)

Esmé Valerie Eliot (née Fletcher; 17 August 1926 – 9 November 2012) was the second wife and later widow of the Nobel Prize-winning poet T. S. Eliot. She was a major shareholder in the publishing firm of Faber and Faber Limited and the editor and annotator of a number of books dealing with her late husband's writings.

== Early life ==
The daughter of an insurance manager in Leeds, she was educated at Queen Anne's School, Caversham, where she was reputed to have told her headteacher that she knew precisely what she wanted to become: secretary to T. S. Eliot.

== Personal life ==
Valerie married Eliot, almost 40 years her senior, on 10 January 1957. She had been an admirer of Eliot since, at the age of 14, hearing John Gielgud read Journey of the Magi, as she confided to the novelist Charles Morgan, for whom she worked as a secretary. Morgan used his influence to get her a job at Faber and Faber, where she finally met Eliot in August 1949, a debt of kindness which she always acknowledged. They moved to No.3 Kensington Court Gardens where she lived until her death.

In a 1994 interview with The Independent, she recalled a very ordinary life of evenings spent at home playing Scrabble and eating cheese, stating "He obviously needed a happy marriage. He wouldn't die until he'd had it."

Following T. S. Eliot's death in 1965, Valerie was his most important editor and literary executor, having brought to press The Waste Land: Facsimile and Manuscripts of the Original Drafts (1971) and The Letters of T. S. Eliot: Volume 1, 1898–1922 (1989). She assisted Christopher Ricks with his edition of The Inventions of the March Hare (1996), a volume of Eliot's unpublished verse. A long-delayed second volume of Eliot's letters was also edited by her.

One of Valerie Eliot's most lucrative decisions as executor was granting permission for a stage musical to be based on her husband's work Old Possum's Book of Practical Cats. This became the hit Andrew Lloyd Webber musical Cats. With her portion of the proceeds Valerie Eliot established "Old Possum's Practical Trust" – a literary registered charity – and funded the T. S. Eliot Prize, given annually and worth £25,000.

In 1972 she won the Rose Mary Crawshay Prize for The Waste Land: Facsimile and Manuscripts of the Original Drafts. At the 1983 Tony Awards, Valerie Eliot accepted her husband's posthumous Tony Award for Best Book of a Musical for Cats. The letters were shortlisted for the 1988 National Book Critics Circle Award for Biography.

In late 2009, the second volume of Eliot's letters was published. The third volume, edited by Valerie Eliot and John Haffenden, followed in July 2012.

Valerie Eliot died on 9 November 2012 at her home in London. She was 86 years old.

She was a godparent to the mathematician Marcus du Sautoy.

== See also ==
- Karen Christensen
