= Estella Cave, Countess Cave of Richmond =

English author and Girl Guide leader

- Lady Estella Cave
- Born: April 1856; North Cadbury, Somerset, England
- Died: 7 January 1938 (aged 81); Burnham-on-Sea, Somerset, England
- Other names: Lady Cave; Lady Cave of Richmond; Countess Cave of Richmond
- Occupations: Author, Girl Guide leader
- Spouse: George Cave, 1st Viscount Cave (m. 1885)
- Family: Lloyd Mathews (brother)

Estella Cave, Countess Cave of Richmond (April 1856 – 7 January 1938, Somerset), was an English author and the first to hold the role of Division Commissioner for Kingston Girl Guides from 1911 to 1926. She was the recipient of the Silver Fish Award, Girl Guiding’s highest adult honour. She was married to George Cave, 1st Viscount Cave, who became Lord Chancellor in 1922.

== Early life and family ==
Annie Estella Sarah Penfold Mathews was born in April 1856 at Woolston Manor, North Cadbury, Somerset. She was the fifth child of Captain William Withey Mathew, of the 20th South Rifles, and Jane Wallas Penfold, a naturalist. Her brother, Sir Lloyd William Mathews was an abolitionist. As a child, her mother encouraged her to study nature. She took a particular interest in ants and in 1933 wrote a book about them, Ant Antics.

== Marriage to Rt Hon. George Cave ==
She married the Rt Hon. Lord High Chancellor, 1st Viscount Cave on 7 January 1885 at All Saints Church, Fulham. Over the years, she gave birth to four children, but none survived more than a few days. When they first married, the Caves lived on Richmond Hill, but from 1890 their principal residence was Wardrobe Court, part of Richmond Palace, where Elizabeth I had died. The name "Wardrobe Court" came from its previous incarnation providing soft furnishings for the palace, as well as storage for Elizabeth’s 2,000 gowns. George’s mother moved in with them after her husband’s death in 1894.

Cave was a committed gardener. She researched the original planting of Richmond Palace’s gardens and reinstated the pomegranate tree, which once stood in the garden in memory of Catherine of Aragon, together with historically accurate walnut, mulberry, quince and chequer trees.

In 1906, when George became a member of the Conservative Government, they had a home on Piccadilly. In 1915, when he became Solicitor general, they moved to Smith Square. During their time at Smith Square, Cave experienced 19 German air raids, and more when at Wardrobe Court. When George became Lord of Appeal in 1918, they left Smith Square and moved back to Wardrobe Court full time. In 1922, when George became Lord Chancellor they had lodgings at the House of Lords.

She counted among her friends the author J. M. Barrie. The two wrote dozens of letters to each other.

=== Travel ===
Cave accompanied her husband on three long journeys, to East Africa in 1901, South Africa in 1919 and North America in 1920. They were keen to move to South Africa for work, but George’s mother would not allow it. They also travelled to Cap Martin, Monte Carlo, Belgium, the Ardennes, the Channel Islands, Skye, Italy, Austria and Norway.

=== Canvassing ===
Cave became involved in politics in 1906, helping her husband with his electioneering. Of this experience she wrote, “At that time I knew nothing of politics, and cared less, but it was for the man I worked, because I knew what he and his work meant for the country.” She went on to become “famed as a first-class political canvasser”.

=== Golf ===
Cave and her husband were both keen golfers and played courses in England, Ireland, Scotland and Le Touquet. The course at Burnham and Berrow in Somerset inspired them to buy a home – St. Ann’s – there in 1917, which lay between the ladies’ course and the men’s course. They would spend all their free time at St Ann’s, and regularly attended St Mary Magdalene church in Berrow.

=== Countess Cave ===
The day her husband died, in March 1928, it was announced that he was to have been bestowed an earldom. The title passed to Cave and the following May, she was created Countess Cave of Richmond, moving to Burnham permanently. Cave died on 7 January 1938 and was buried alongside her husband at St Mary Magdelene, Berrow.

== Community work ==
- President, Burnham Women’s Conservative Association
- President, Burnham Ladies’ Club
- Worked with Barnardo's
- Division Commissioner of Kingston Girl Guides (1911 to 1926)
- President, Burnham and District Girl Guides
- Raised funds for the Royal Star and Garter Home, Richmond
- Lord and Lady Cave “made a practice of visiting the old folk in the Richmond workhouse on Christmas morning.”

== Writing ==
- Memories of Old Richmond, with some sidelights on English history, illustrated by George Brandram (1922)
- From my Rhodesian Diary (1923)
- Odd and Ends of My Life (1928)
- Three Journeys (1928), based on her journeys to East Africa, including Zanzibar and Uganda, South Africa, America and Canada. It was written in response to a bet from Cave’s sister-in-law that she wouldn’t be able to maintain a diary for her entire travels.
- Lord Cave: A Memoir (1931) by Sir Charles Mallet (introductory chapter)
- Ant Antics, including illustrations (1933), a book of verse in praise of ants, with additional poems from Stanley Baldwin, Robert Baden-Powell, 1st Baron Baden-Powell, and Rudyard Kipling among others. The foreword read: “For many years Lady Cave has taken a special interest in the high character and domestic virtues of the ant. She has acquired much quaint information about them, and her enthusiasm has impelled some of her friends to break out at her behest into (often most unaccustomed) verse. Prime Ministers and Professors, Men of Business and Men of Leisure, all contribute to this very real ant-hology.”

Cave contributed articles to The Nineteenth Century and After periodical including From my Rhodesian diary (1922), From my Canadian diary (1923) and Some Notes on Dress (1924).

== Awards and honours ==
- 1926 - Silver Fish Award
- 1935 - King George’s Jubilee medal
- Queen Elisabeth Medal

== See also ==
- http://www.captureburnham.co.uk/people/movers-and-shakers/lord-cave
- Bury, Adrian (1968) Just a Moment in Time: Some Recollections of a Versatile Life in Art, Literature & Journalism Pub. Charles Skilton
