= Order of Hamondieh =

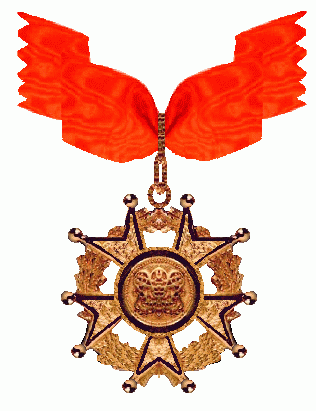
- Insignia of the order

Awarded by Sultan of Zanzibar
- Type: House Order
- Status: Abolished 1911

The Order of Hamondieh was a decoration of the Sultanate of Zanzibar. The award was usually made in recognition of services rendered to the Sultan or state of Zanzibar.

It was awarded in the following order of precedence:

- Grand Order
- First Class
- Second Class
- Third Class
- Fourth Class
- Fifth Class.

== Famous recipients ==
- Lloyd Mathews - Grand Order
- Arthur Raikes - First Class
- Admiral Harry Rawson - Unknown class
- Faisal bin Turki, Sultan of Muscat and Oman - First Class in brilliants

== Other recipients ==
- Alexander Stuart Rogers, First class, 1902
