= Jane Wallas Penfold =

English naturalist and illustrator

Jane Wallas Mathews
- Born: Jane Wallas Penfold; 1 November 1820; Funchal, Madeira, Portugal
- Died: 9 February 1884 (aged 63); Castle Cary, Somerset
- Occupations: Naturalist, Illustrator
- Spouse: Captain William Withey Mathews (m. 1847)
- Children: 7, including Lloyd Mathews and Estella, Lady Cave

Jane Wallas Penfold (1 November 1820 - 9 February 1884), later Mrs. William Mathews, was an English naturalist and illustrator. She published Madeira: Flowers, Fruits and Ferns in 1845, which included a poem by William Wordsworth.

== Personal life ==
Penfold was born in Madeira to wine merchant William Penfold and mother Sarah Penfold, née Gilbert. She had eight siblings. One was fellow botanical artist, Augusta Robley (née Penfold). Her family acquired the Quinta da Achada wine estate on Madeira in the 19th century. Her mother was the aunt of Mary Anne Symonds, who married Charles Ridpath Blandy in 1835 and is ancestor of the family of that name who continue to reside on Madeira.

Jane Penfold married Captain William Withey Mathews at the British Consulate in Madeira in March 1846, followed by a celebration at Castle Cary, Somerset, England on 26 July 1847. After her marriage, she lived at Woolston Manor and Crewkerne, in Somerset. After her first child died soon after birth, she and her husband had seven more children. Six survived to adulthood, including Sir Lloyd Mathews, and Estella (later Countess Cave of Richmond).

== Botany ==
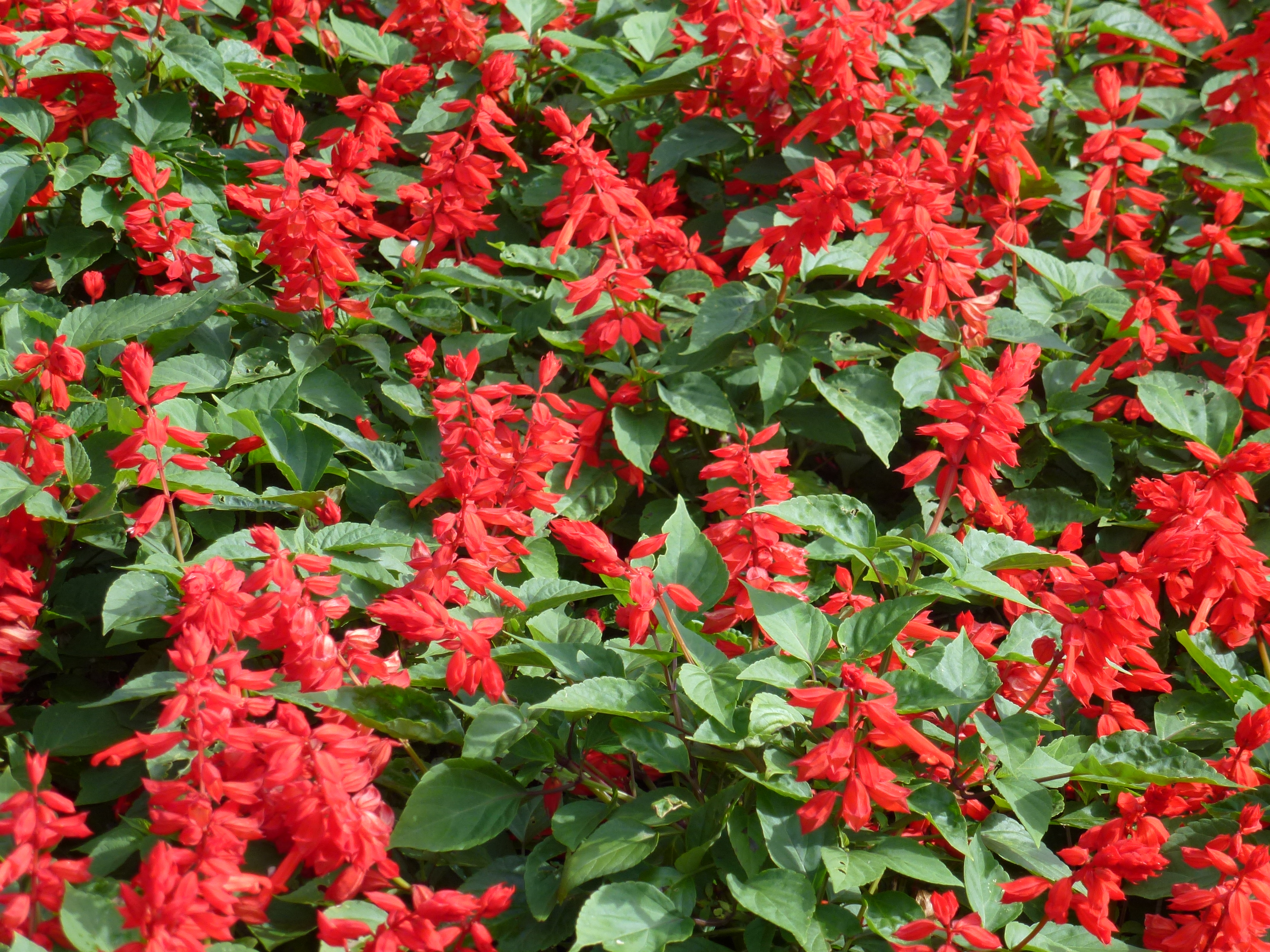
Salvia splendens

Penfold introduced Salvia splendens (t.x.) to Madeira from a "small plant in England". By the 1860s it was "the principal ornamental shrub in most cottage gardens" on the island. The Portuguese used the petals to make a rose-coloured dye.

== Book ==
Penfold published Madeira: Flowers, Fruits and Ferns in 1845, including 20 plates of coloured illustrations by Penfold. It was published by Lovelle Augustus Reeve and was written "to gratify those visitors and residents who take an interest in [Madeiran] productions." It included scientific descriptions of the plants by Rev. W L P Garnons.

=== Wordsworth poem ===
William Wordsworth wrote a poem for Penfold on New Year's Day 1843. Titled To a Lady in answer to a request that I would write her a poem upon some drawings that she had made of flowers in the Island of Madeira, which featured in her 1845 book.

It begins:

FAIR LADY! Can I sing of flowers
That in Madeira bloom and fade.
I, who ne'er sate within their bowers
Nor through their sunny lawns have strayed.

— William Wordsworth, Composed at the request of Jane Wallas Penfold, The Poems of William Wordsworth

It is thought that while Penfold didn't know Wordsworth personally, there may have been a Cumbrian family connection. The poem also featured in the Knight edition of Poetical Works of William Wordsworth.

Madeira: Flowers, Fruits and Ferns also included a poem by Mrs Calverley Bewicke, Song of the Madeira Flowers.

== Gallery ==
A selection of Penfold's illustrations from her 1845 book Madeira Flowers, Fruits and Ferns:

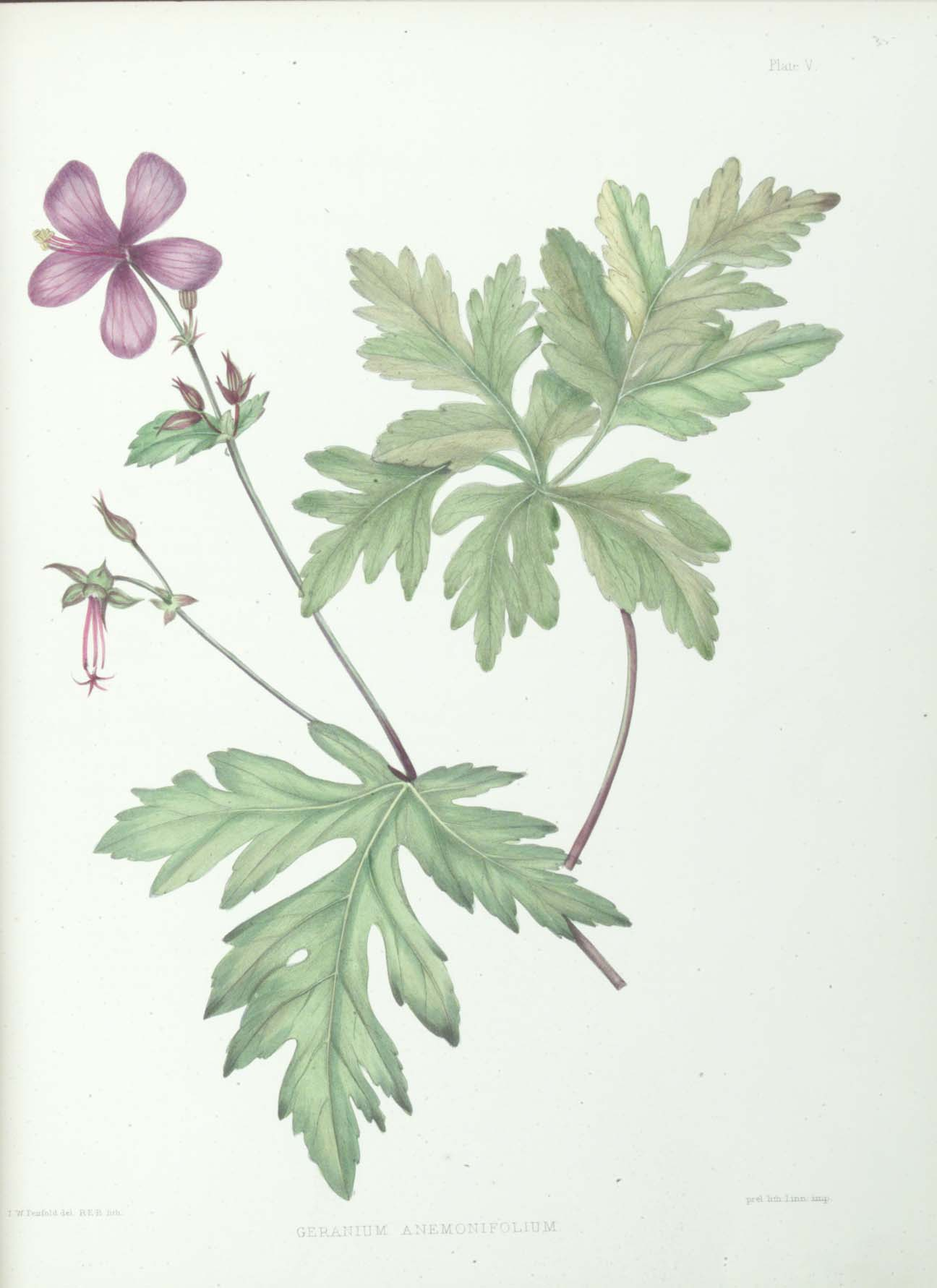
Geranium Anemonifolium

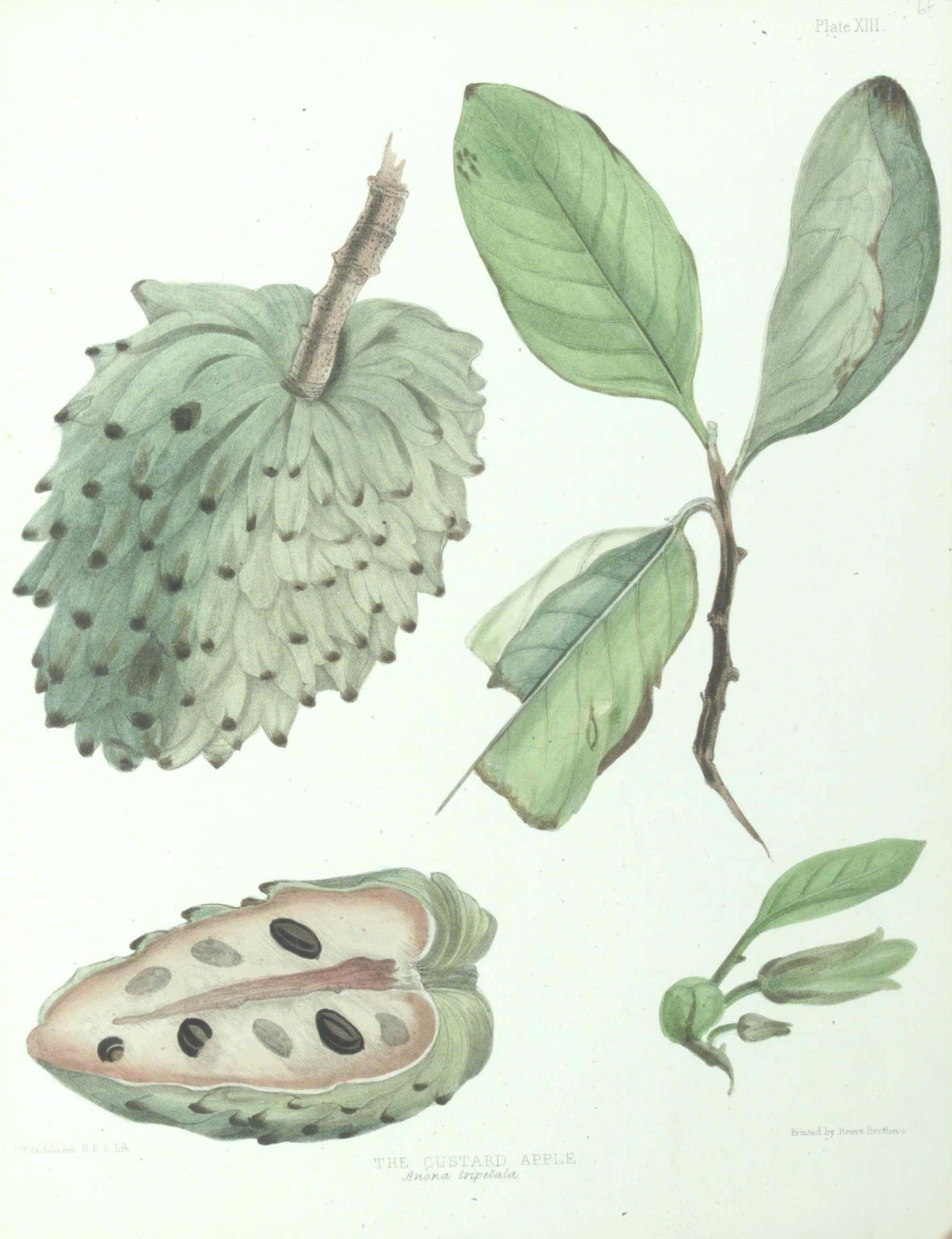
The Custard Apple

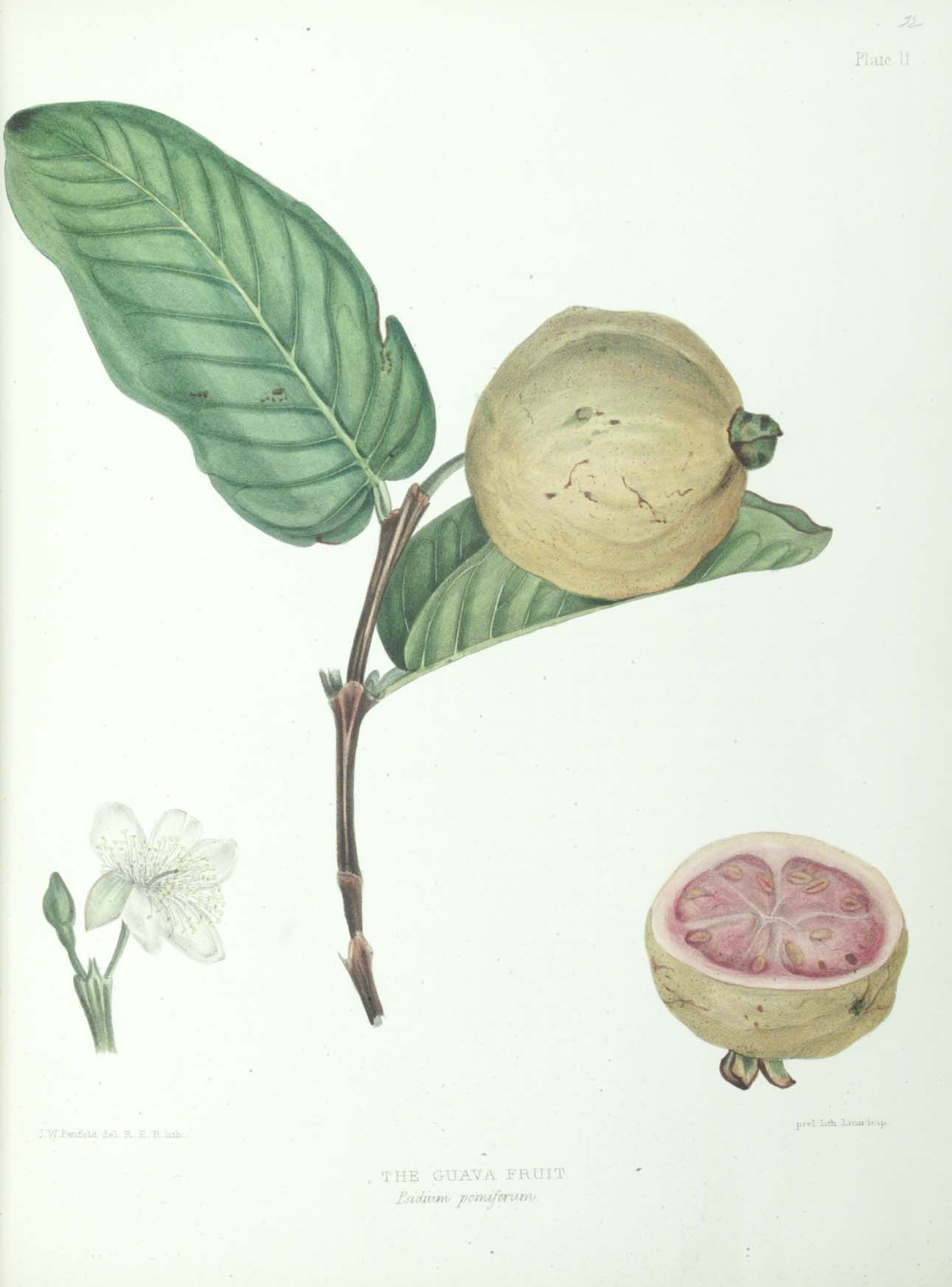
The Guava Fruit

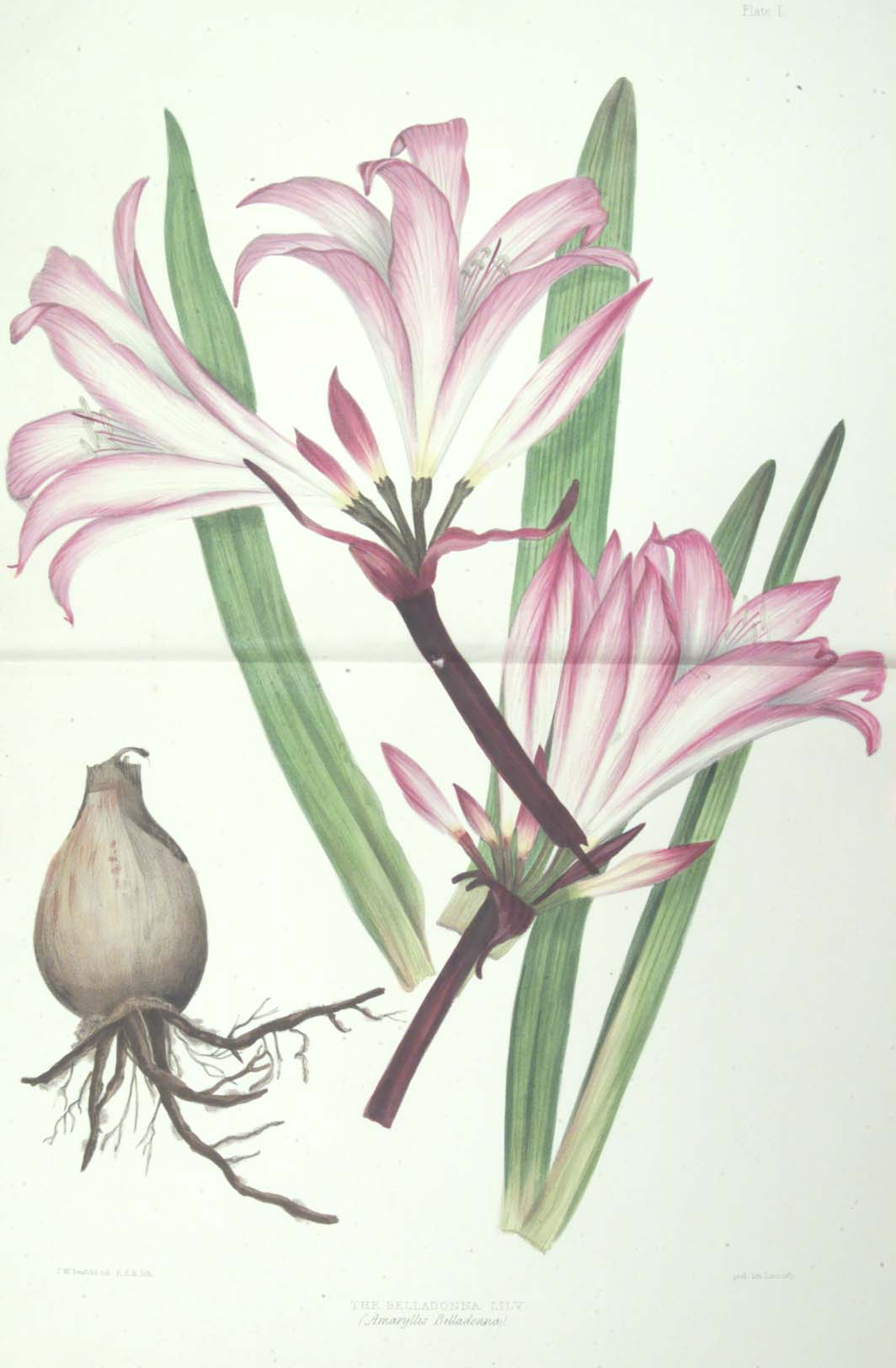
The Belladonna Lily

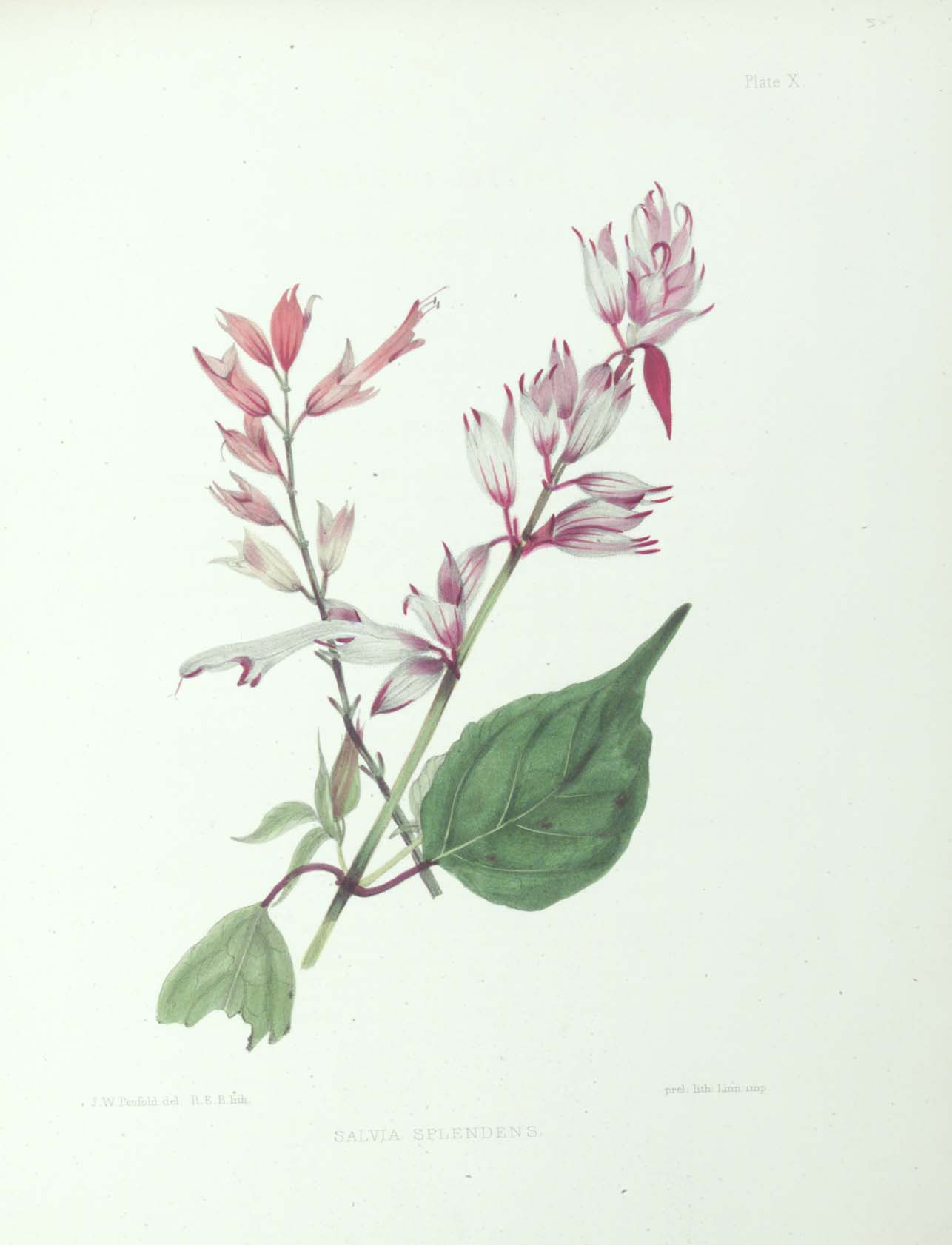
Salvia Splendens

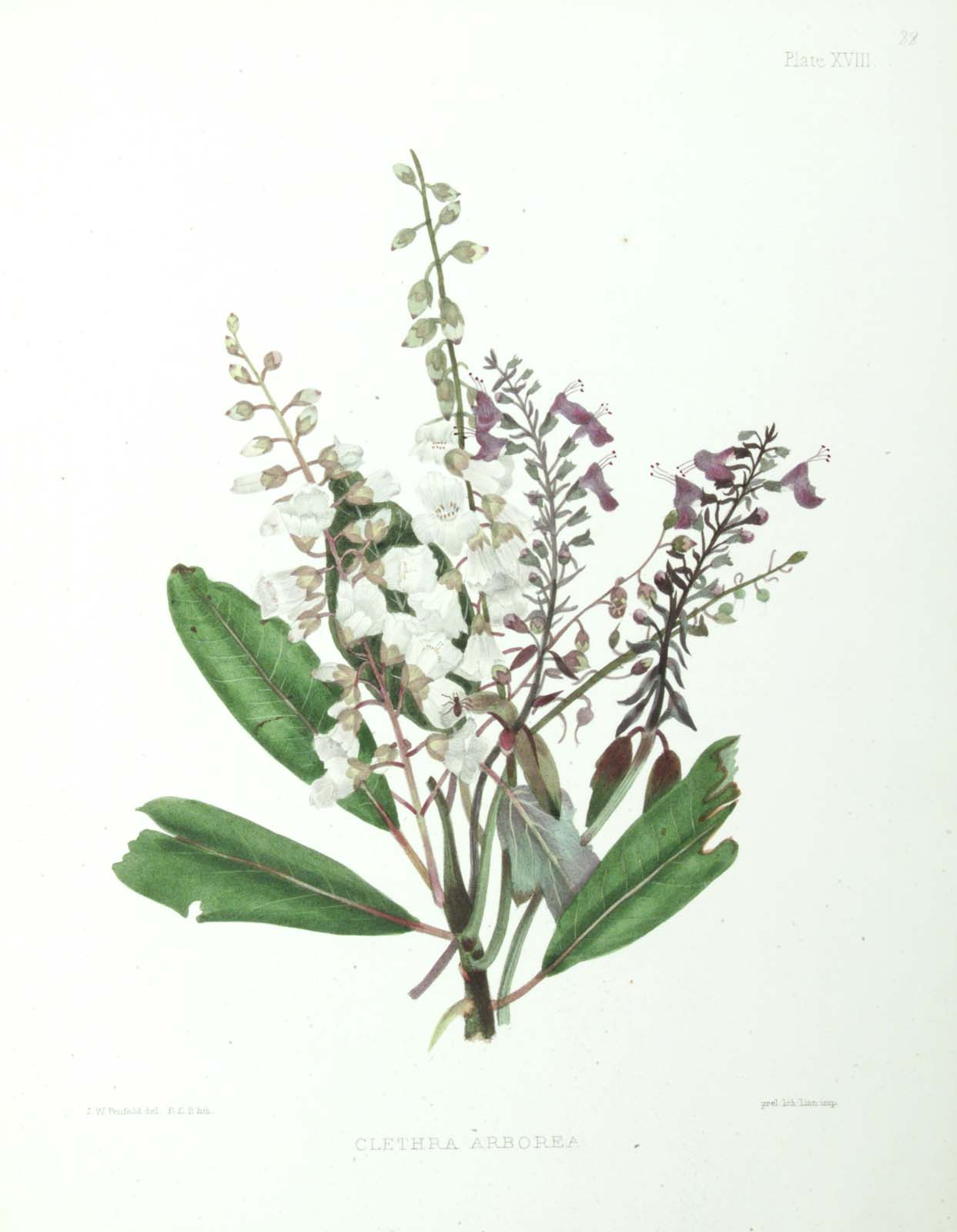
Clethra arborea

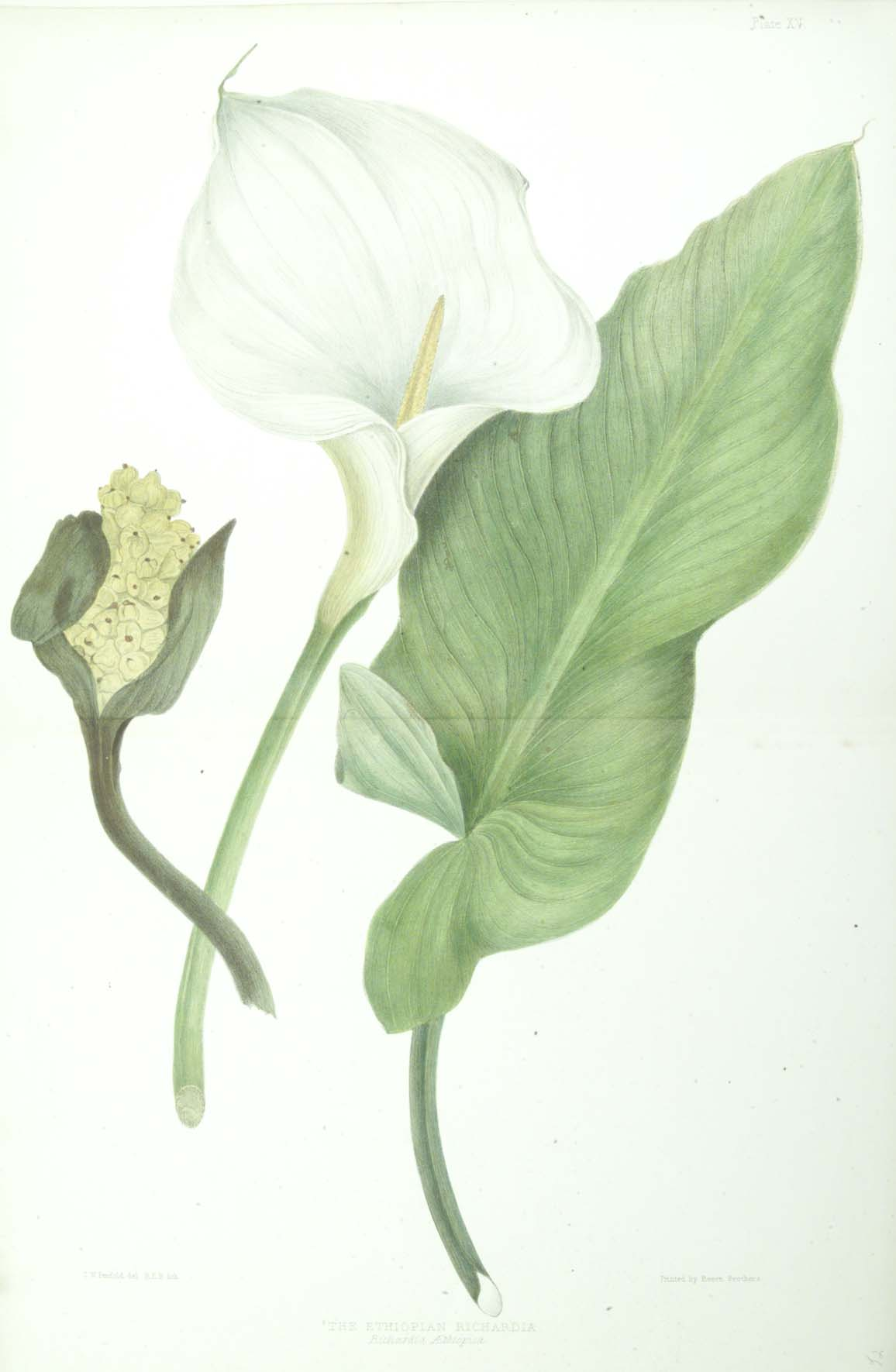
The Ethiopian Richardia

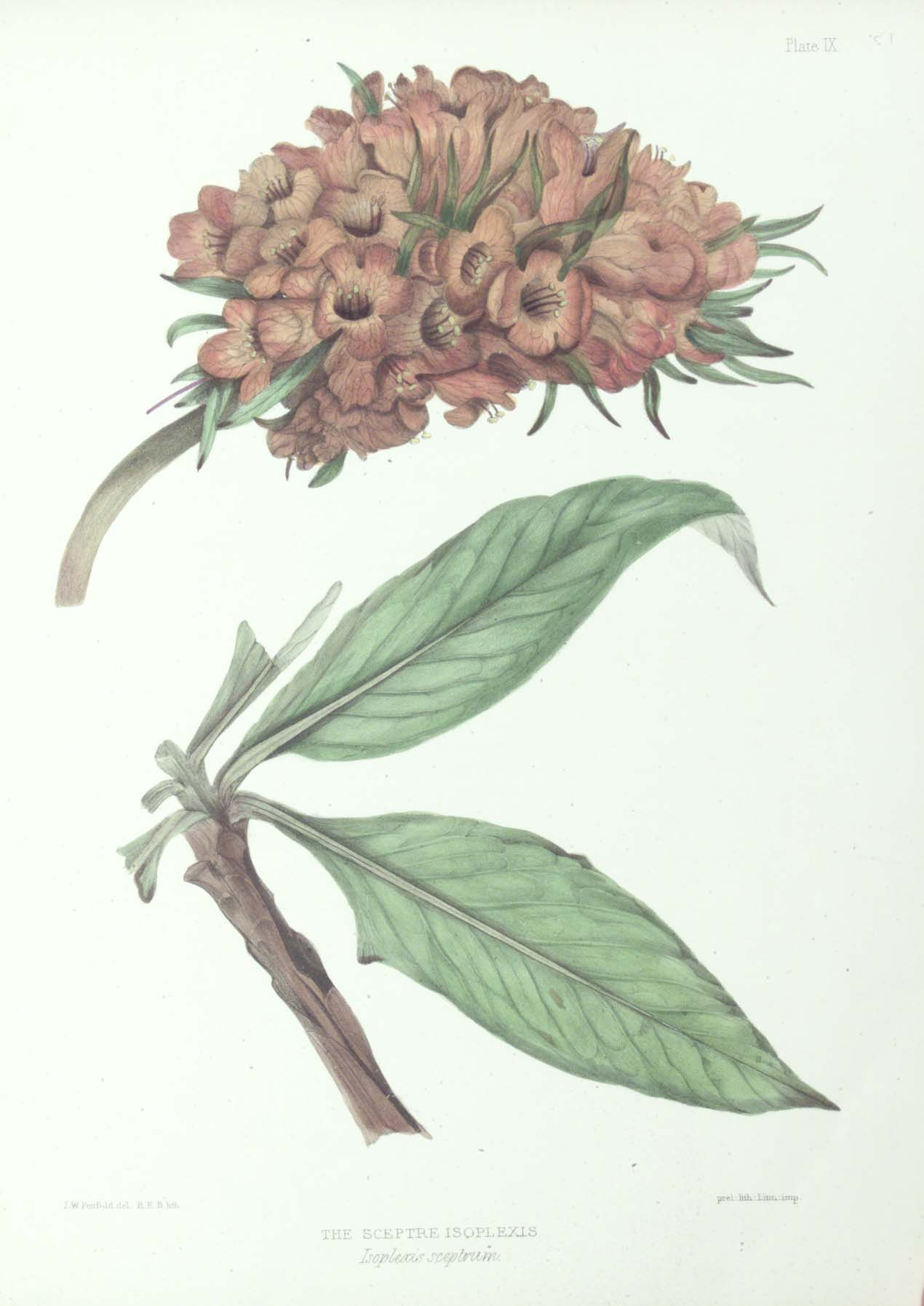
The Sceptre Isoplexis
