= Kensington Court Gardens =

Late Victorian apartment building

Coordinates: 51.4999°N 0.1878°W

Entrance to apartments 1-14b

Kensington Court Gardens is a late Victorian mansion block, completed in 1889, near to Kensington Palace and Gardens. It was the erstwhile residence of T. S. Eliot.

== History ==
The location of today's Kensington Court Place was formerly part of the Vallotton estate, dating back to the late 18th century. Kensington Court Place was originally known as Charles Street and renamed in 1908. The eastern side of Charles Street was the former site of open grounds, known as The Paddock. It was the home of the Kensington Lawn Tennis Club prior to being bought by local surveyor, Albert James Barker for building development in 1886.

Kensington Court Gardens from corner of Thackeray St and Kensington Court Place

The mansion block, Kensington Court Gardens is believed to be designed by Henry W. Peck and built by Frederick Moir of Moir, Wallis and Company in 1887–9 in association with Albert Barker. Albert Barker was responsible for a large amount of the building development around Thackeray Street, Ansdell Street and Kensington Court Place and was responsible for much of the street layout that we see today.

The Times first advertised flats for Kensington Court Gardens in January 1889 at between £195 and £250 per annum. Kensington Court Gardens first appears in the London Directory in 1889, listed with Moir Wallis & Co. Builders, with building works not completed. The first residents appear in the 1890 Directory, with flat No.1 again, with Moir Wallis & Co.

During the 1890s, a number of residents were retired military men. The 1891 census shows residents General Alexander Silver, Lieutenant-Colonel Arnold Knight and Major-General James Black. The 1901 census and Royal Blue Book show other notable residents, including the builder Frederick Moir at No.7 and publisher Herbert Doubleday at No.9. Doubleday was responsible for the publishing of the Victoria History of the Counties of England and The Complete Peerage. Flat No.1 Kensington Court Gardens was originally the home of the building caretaker, listed in the 1891 census as Mr Charles Hall with his wife Emily. The 1901 census shows No.1 as the home of James E. Raybould, Hall Porter, with his wife Elizabeth.

Other notable residents include the Kopman family, who amassed their fortune from property development and investment banking.

== T. S. Eliot ==
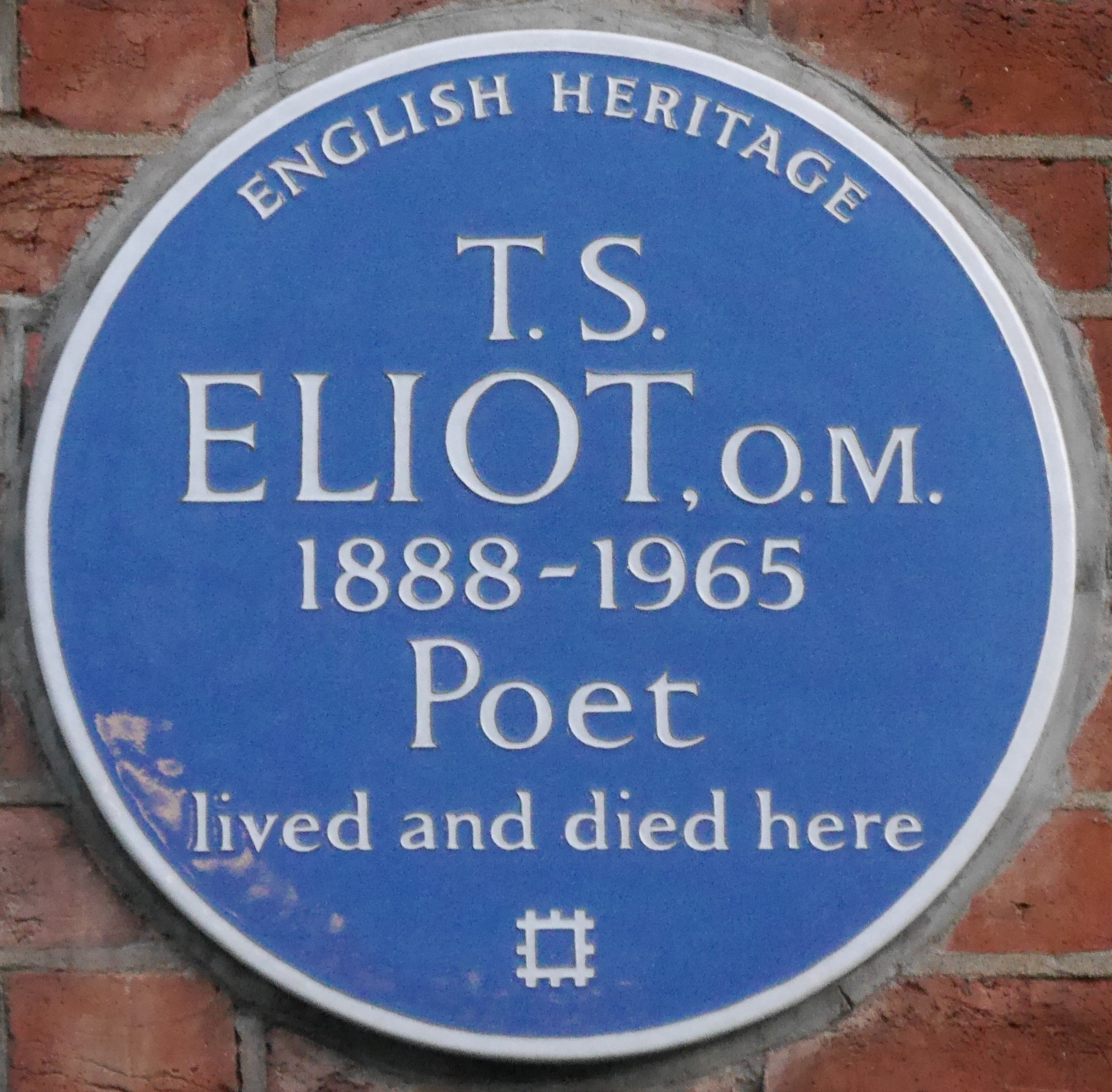
T. S. Eliot blue plaque, 3 Kensington Court Gardens

It is most famously the residence of poet, critic and playwright, T. S. Eliot who moved to No.3 Kensington Court Gardens in 1957, after his secret marriage to his secretary from Faber and Faber, (Esmé) Valerie Eliot on 10 January 1957. The marriage was criticised not only because it was kept a secret from all but her parents, but at the time Eliot was 68 and Valerie only 30 years old.

Despite the criticism and the age difference, it appears to have been the happiest time of Eliot's life, the Oxford Dictionary of Biography stating he "attained a degree of contentedness that had eluded him all his life". Eliot's health was already in decline and he died in the flat only eight years later, on 4 January 1965. His widow lived at the flat until her death in 2012. She was editor and custodian of his correspondence, only recently published (in three volumes, 1996, 2009, and 2012).
