= Order of the Brilliant Star of Zanzibar =

Award of merit, Zanzibar

- Ribbon of the order

Awarded by Sultan of Zanzibar
- Type: House Order
- Status: Awarded by the Zanzibari royal family

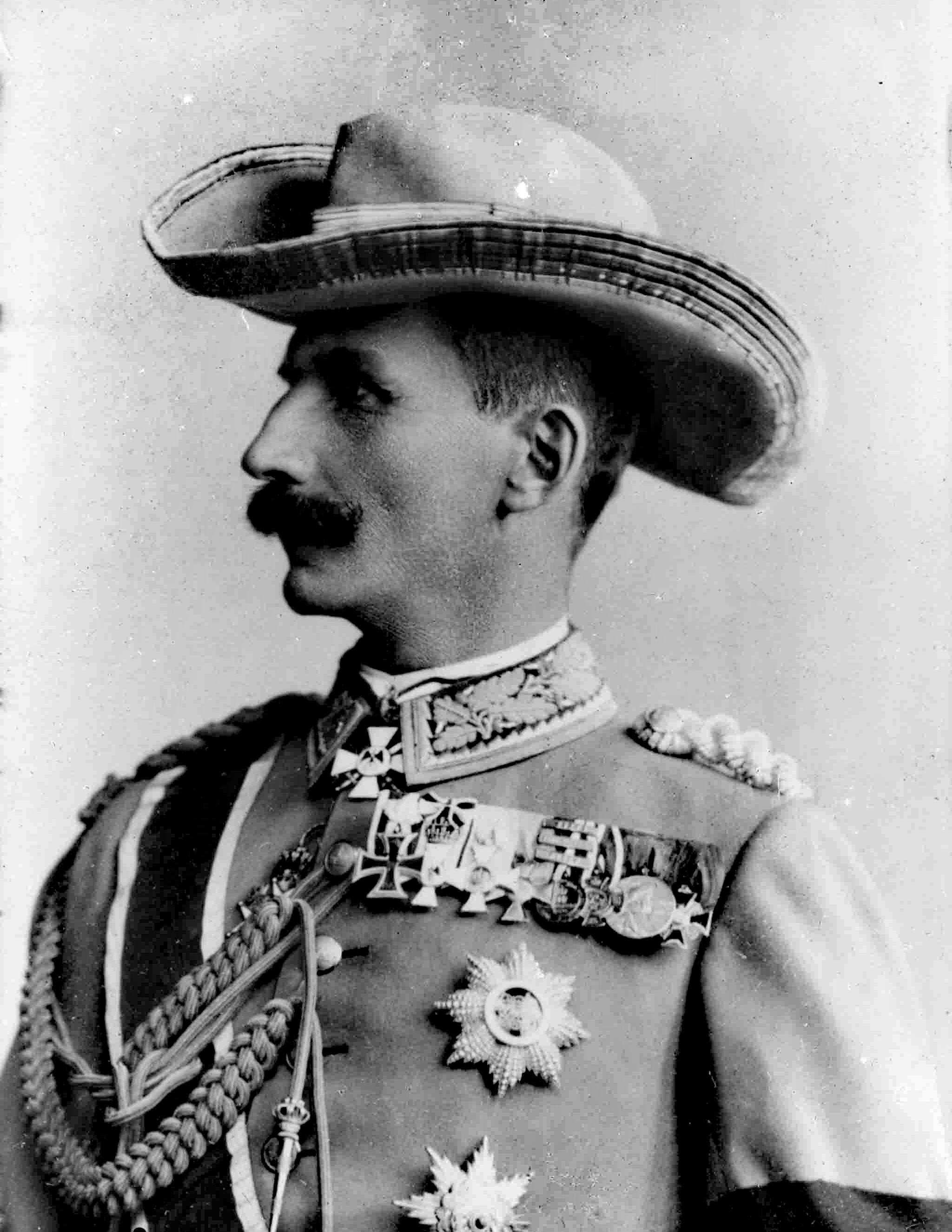
Eduard von Liebert wearing sash and breast order of the Brilliant Star of Zanzibar

The Order of the Brilliant Star of Zanzibar (Wisam al-Kawkab al-Durri al-Zanzibari) is a decoration awarded by the Sultan of Zanzibar for meritorious services and since the Order of Independence was created in 1963 it is reserved for the persons rendering extraordinary service to the Sultan, his heirs and successors and other members of the royal family. It was a state order from its inception in 1865 to the overthrow of the Sultanate on 12 January 1964 and currently is a House Order of the Zanzibari royal family. Current Grand Master is Sayyid Jamshid bin Abdullah Al Said, Titular Sultan of Zanzibar. Initially the decoration had two grades, the first of which was usually awarded to foreign heads of state and the second which was further subdivided into five hierarchical classes. Currently the second grade only is being awarded.

== History ==
The Order was instituted by Sultan Sayyid Majid bin Said Al-Busaid in 1865, amended by Sultan Barghash bin Said on 22 December 1875, and amended again by Sultan Sayyid Sir Khalifa II bin Harub Al-Said on 5 August 1918 when it became an award in five classes for meritorious service (1. First Class – limited to 40 recipients, 2. Second Class – 60 recipients, 3. Third Class – 80 recipients, 4. Fourth Class – 90 recipients, and 5. Fifth Class – 100 recipients).

== Design ==
Both classes awarded neck medals in medallion form to be worn around the neck on formal occasions and breast badges, smaller awards which could be worn on the left breast like conventional medals. The neck medal was made of silver gilt, enamel and gold with a five pointed star surrounded by a wreath. The centre of the medal featured a portrait of the awarding Sultan for the first grade medals and the Sultan's monogram in gold on a red background for the second grade. The breast order was an eight pointed star in silver, again featuring the Sultan's portrait for the first grade and a monogram for the second. The ribbon for all medals was red with white edges.

== Classes and insignia ==
I grade

- Grand Cross

II grade

- Grand Cross (limited to 40 members)
- Grand Officer (limited to 60 members)
- Commander (limited to 80 members)
- Officer (limited to 90 members)
- Member (limited to 100 members)

Insignia
Order of the Brilliant Star of Zanzibar II grade breast star	Order of the Brilliant Star of Zanzibar II grade sash and sash badge	Order of the Brilliant Star of Zanzibar II grade Commander neck badge	Order of the Brilliant Star of Zanzibar II grade Officer badge
Grand Cross	Grand Cross	Commander	Officer

== Notable recipients ==
- Prince Shah Karim Al Hussaini, Aga Khan IV
- Otto von Bismarck (I grade with diamonds)
- Paul von Buri
- Henry Edward Colvile
- Clement Lloyd Hill
- Princess Margaret, Countess of Snowdon
- Lloyd Mathews
- Isma'il Pasha
- Cecil Pereira
- Prince Philip, Duke of Edinburgh
- Arthur Raikes
- Harry Rawson
- John Houston Sinclair
- Michael Tighe (Indian Army officer)
- Hermann Wissmann (II grade, Grand Cross)
- Eduard von Liebert (II grade, Grand Cross)

== Gallery ==
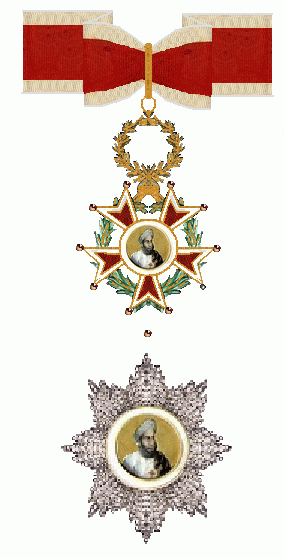
Neck and breast versions of the First (or sovereign's) Order

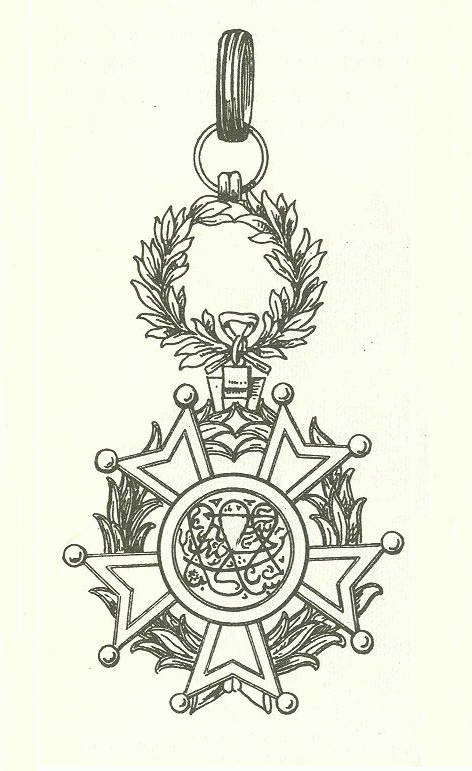
Neck version of the third class of the Second Order

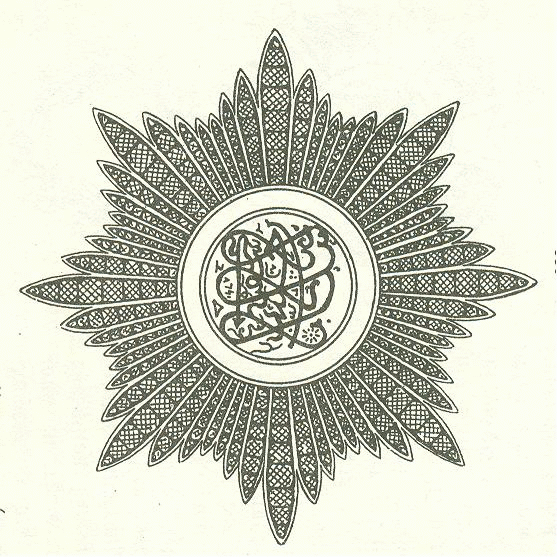
Breast version of the Second Order
