= First minister =

Leader in a government cabinet

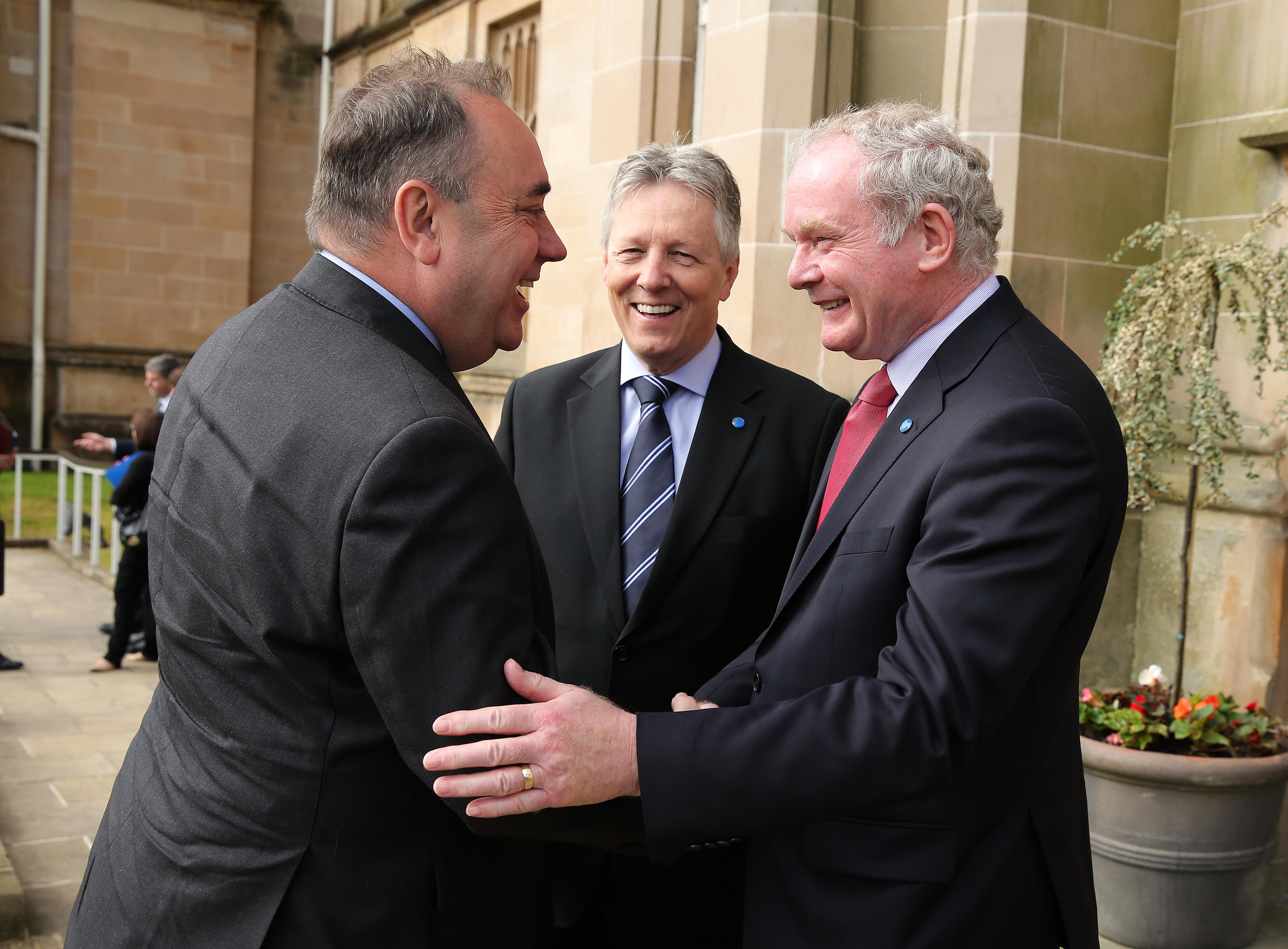
The First Minister of Scotland (left) meets with the First Minister and deputy First Minister of Northern Ireland

A first minister is any of a variety of leaders of government cabinets. The term literally has the same meaning as "prime minister".

In the United Kingdom, the title of first minister is used to refer to the political leader of a devolved national government, such as the devolved governments of Scotland, Wales, and Northern Ireland, or of a dependent territory.

In Australia and Canada, the term is used to refer collectively to the Prime Minister and the state or provincial premiers.

== Australia ==
In Australia, a first minister is one of the heads of government, including the Prime Minister of Australia and the Premiers and chief ministers of the Australian states and territories.

== Canada ==
In Canada, a first minister is any of the Canadian first ministers of the Crown, otherwise known as heads of government, including the Prime Minister of Canada and the provincial and territorial premiers. The title is used in such formulae as "first ministers' meetings".

In Newfoundland and Labrador, the Inuit self-governing region of Nunatsiavut provides for a first minister responsible to the Nunatsiavut Assembly.

== Norway ==
The head of government of Norway was called first minister (Norwegian: førstestatsråd) between 1814 and 1873, while it was in personal union with Sweden. In 1893, 12 years prior to the dissolution of the union, it was changed to prime minister (statsminister).

== United Kingdom ==
In the United Kingdom, the term first minister was once used interchangeably with prime minister, such as when Winston Churchill stated: "I did not become His Majesty's First Minister so that I might oversee the liquidation of the British Empire!"

Since 1999 the term has been used to describe the leaders of the devolved governments of Scotland, Wales and Northern Ireland. See

- List of first ministers
- First Minister of Scotland
- First Minister of Wales
- First Minister and deputy First Minister of Northern Ireland

== Other ==
In Australia, the premiers and chief ministers are the first ministers of the states and territories respectively.

In Germany, the first minister in each federal state is known as the Minister President (Ministerpräsident). A similar term exists in countries with some historic German influence, e.g. Latvia, the Netherlands etc.

In Malaysia, the first minister for each state with a Malay ruler is known as the Menteri Besar. Meanwhile, the heads of government in the four states without a monarch are called chief ministers.

George Price held the office of First Minister of British Honduras from 1961 until 1964, when it became self-governing and the title was changed to Premier. He continued as Premier after the colony changed its names to Belize, and then as Prime Minister after Belize gained full independence in 1981.
