= List of British representatives in Zanzibar =

Map of Zanzibar Archipelago

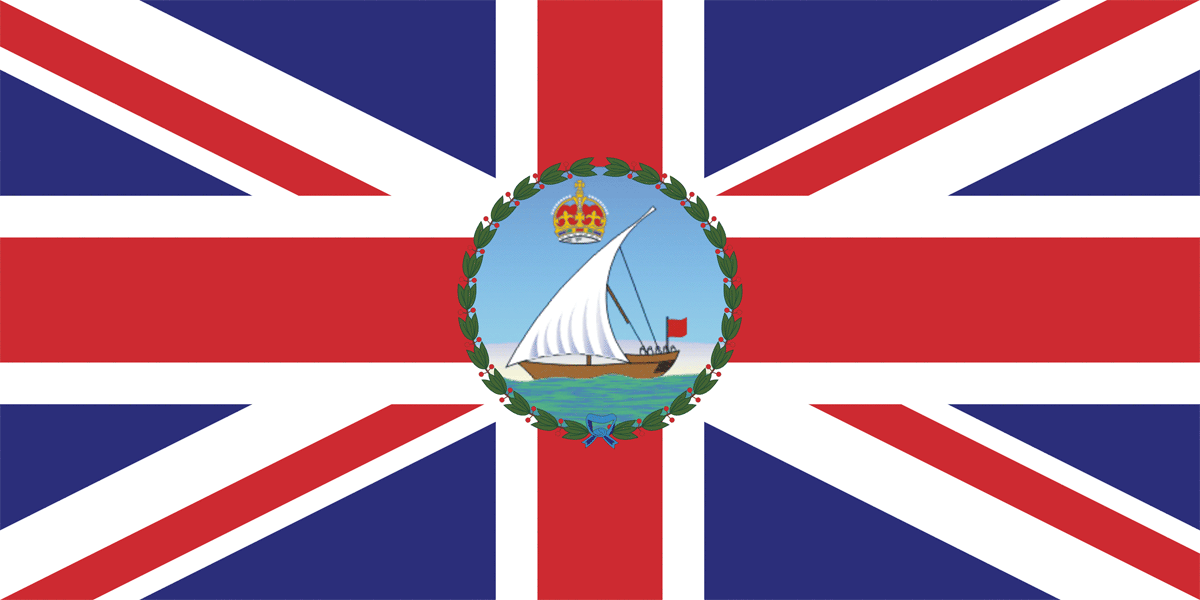
Flag of the British Resident in Zanzibar (1918–1955)

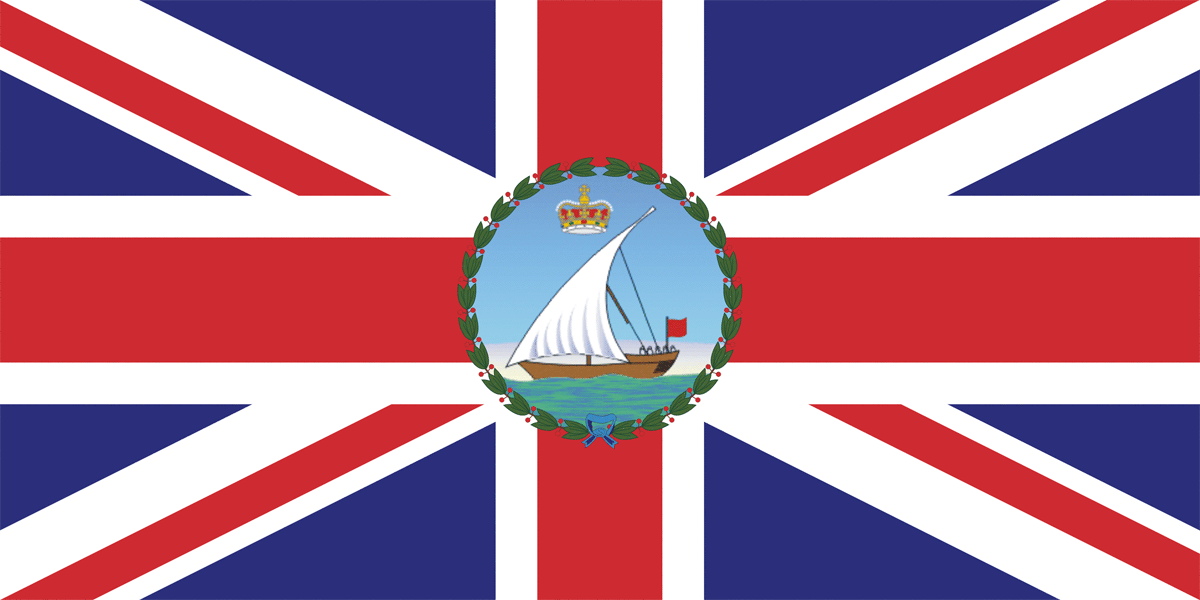
Flag of the British Resident in Zanzibar (1955–1963)

This is a list of British representatives in Zanzibar from 1841 to 1963. They were responsible for representing British interests in the Sultanate of Zanzibar. From 1913 to 1961 they were also the vizier of the Sultan of Zanzibar.

On 7 November 1890, the United Kingdom proclaimed protectorate over the sultanate (according to the terms of the Heligoland–Zanzibar Treaty with the German Empire). On 10 December 1963, the United Kingdom terminated its protectorate.

On 12 January 1964, the sultanate was overthrown in the Zanzibar Revolution, and the People's Republic of Zanzibar was proclaimed. On 26 April 1964, the People's Republic united with mainland Tanganyika to form the United Republic of Tanganyika and Zanzibar, which was later renamed to the United Republic of Tanzania.

== List ==
(Dates in italics indicate de facto continuation of office.)

Tenure	Portrait	Incumbent	Notes
May 1841 to 5 July 1857		Atkins Hamerton, Consul	
1858 to 1860		Christopher Palmer Rigby, Consul	
1861 to 1862		Lewis Pelly, Consul	
1862 to 1865		Robert Lambert Playfair, Consul	
1865 to 1870		Henry Adrian Churchill, Consul	
1870 to 1873		John Kirk, Consul	
1873 to 1886		John Kirk, Consul-General	
1887 to 1888		Claude Maxwell MacDonald, Consul-General	
1888 to 7 November 1890		Sir Charles Bean Euan-Smith, Consul-General	
7 November 1890 to 5 March 1891		Sir Charles Bean Euan-Smith, acting Consul-General	
6 March 1891 to 12 December 1892		Gerald Herbert Portal, Consul-General	From 6 August 1892, Sir Gerald Herbert Portal
12 December 1892 to February 1894		James Rennell Rodd, Consul-General	
February 1894 to 1900		Arthur Henry Hardinge, Consul-General	From 22 June 1897, Sir Arthur Henry Hardinge
1900 to 1904		Sir Charles Norton Edgecumbe Eliot, Agent and Consul-General	
1904 to 20 June 1908		Basil Shillito Cave, Agent and Consul-General	
1908 to 13 February 1913		Edward Clarke, Agent and Consul-General	
1 July 1913 to 1922		Francis Barrow Pearce, Resident	
1922 to December 1923		John Houston Sinclair, Resident	
January 1924 to 1929		Alfred Claud Hollis, Resident	From 1 January 1927, Sir Alfred Claud Hollis
December 1929 to 1937		Richard Sims Donkin Rankine, Resident	From 3 June 1932, Sir Richard Sims Donkin Rankine
1937		Samuel Burnside Boyd McElderry, acting Resident	
October 1937 to 1940		John Hathorn Hall, Resident	
1941 to 1946		Henry Guy Pilling, Resident	
1946 to 1951		Vincent Goncalves Glenday, Resident	
1952 to 1954		John Dalzell Rankine, Resident	
2 November 1954 to 1959		Henry Steven Potter, Resident	From 31 May 1956, Sir Henry Steven Potter
1959 to 1963		Arthur George Rixson Mooring, Resident	

== See also ==
- History of Zanzibar
- Sultanate of Zanzibar
