= John Rankine (colonial administrator) =

British colonial administrator (1907–1987)

Sir John Rankine KCMG KCVO KStJ
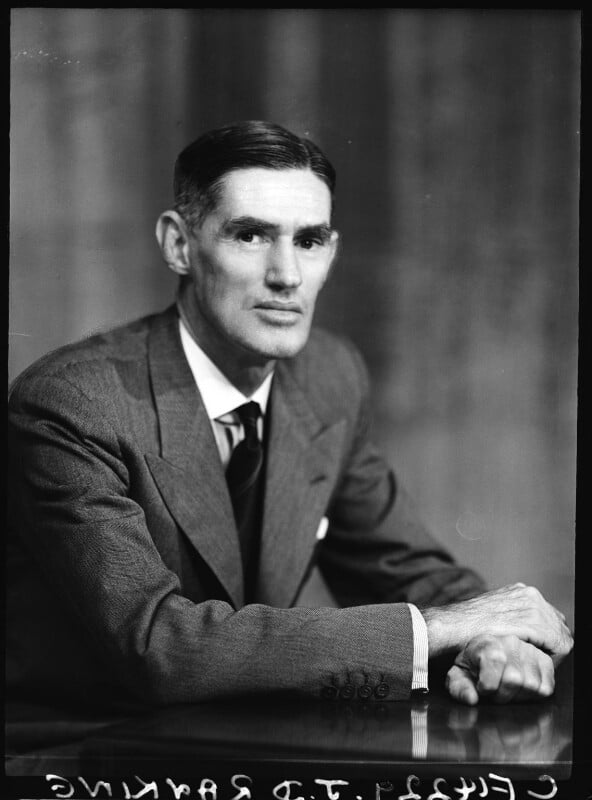
- Rankine in 1952

1st Governor of Western Nigeria
- In office 1 October 1954 – July 1960
- Monarch: Elizabeth II
- Premier: Obafemi Awolowo; Samuel Akintola
- Preceded by: None (new office)
- Succeeded by: Sir Adesoji Aderemi

9th Resident of Zanzibar
- In office 1952–1954
- Monarch: Elizabeth II
- Sultan of Zanzibar: Khalifa bin Harub
- Preceded by: Vincent Glenday
- Succeeded by: Henry Steven Potter

Acting Governor of Fiji
- In office 23 October 1944 – 1 January 1945
- Monarch: George VI
- Preceded by: Sir John Nicoll (acting)
- Succeeded by: Sir Alexander Grantham
- In office 12 January 1944 – 4 May 1944
- Preceded by: Sir Philip Mitchell
- Succeeded by: Sir John Nicoll (acting)

Personal details
- Born: John Dalzell Rankine; 8 June 1907 Colony of Fiji
- Died: 19 February 1987 (aged 79)
- Spouse(s): Janet Grace Austin, Lady Rankine (1939–1976, her death)
- Children: 1 daughter
- Education: Exeter College, Oxford
- Occupation: Colonial administrator

Sir John Dalzell Rankine KCMG KCVO KStJ (8 June 1907 – 19 February 1987) was a British colonial administrator.

== Early life and career ==
Rankine studied at Christ's College, in Christchurch, New Zealand, and went on to graduate from Exeter College, Oxford, in 1930. After starting out as a cadet in Uganda in 1931, he became Assistant Secretary to the East African Governor's Conference in 1939 and First Assistant Secretary in 1942.

== Senior administrative positions ==
Rankine served as Assistant Colonial Secretary of Fiji from 1942 to 1945; during this period he twice acted as Governor in an interim capacity. He subsequently became Colonial Secretary of Barbados from 1945 to 1947, then Chief Secretary of Kenya from 1947 to 1951. During this time he also presided over Kenya's Development and Reconstruction Authority.

Rankine served as Resident of Zanzibar from 1952 to 1954, an office his father, Richard Rankine, had previously held from 1929 to 1937. Officially, the office of Resident in the British Protectorate was equivalent to that of an Ambassador. In reality, it made him a colonial governor in all but name, as the Resident was ex officio vizier to the Sultan of Zanzibar and held all effective power. He went on to become Governor of Western Nigeria from 1954 to 1960, when Nigeria became independent.

Rankine was honoured with the CMG in the 1947 Birthday Honours, KCMG in 1954, Brilliant Star of Zanzibar, 1st Class in 1954, KCVO in 1956, and KStJ in 1958.

Government offices
Preceded by Sir Philip Mitchell	Acting Governor of Fiji; 1944	Succeeded by Sir John Nicoll (Acting)
Preceded by Sir John Nicoll (Acting)	Acting Governor of Fiji; 1944–1945	Succeeded by Sir Alexander Grantham
Preceded by Vincent Glenday	Resident of Zanzibar; 1944–1945	Succeeded by Sir Harry Potter
New office	Governor of Western Nigeria; 1944–1945	Succeeded by Sir Adesoji Aderemi
