= Tanzania at the 2015 World Aquatics Championships =

- Flag of Tanzania
- FINA code: TAN
- National federation: Tanzania Swimming Association

in Kazan, Russia
- Competitors: 3 in 1 sport
- Medals: Gold 0 Silver 0 Bronze 0 Total 0

World Aquatics Championships appearances
- 1973; 1975; 1978; 1982; 1986; 1991; 1994; 1998; 2001; 2003; 2005; 2007; 2009; 2011; 2013; 2015; 2017; 2019; 2022; 2023; 2024

Tanzania competed at the 2015 World Aquatics Championships in Kazan, Russia from 24 July to 9 August 2015.

== Swimming ==
Tanzanian swimmers have achieved qualifying standards in the following events (up to a maximum of 2 swimmers in each event at the A-standard entry time, and 1 at the B-standard):

Men

Athlete	Event	Heat		Semifinal		Final	
Athlete	Event	Time	Rank	Time	Rank	Time	Rank
Ammaar Ghadiyali	100 m freestyle	58.22	=100	did not advance			
Ammaar Ghadiyali	50 m butterfly	28.81	66	did not advance			
Hilal Hemed Hilal	50 m freestyle	24.86	72	did not advance			
Hilal Hemed Hilal	100 m butterfly	1:03.87	70	did not advance			

Women

Athlete	Event	Heat		Semifinal		Final	
Athlete	Event	Time	Rank	Time	Rank	Time	Rank
Magdalena Moshi	50 m freestyle	29.62	86	did not advance			
Magdalena Moshi	100 m freestyle	1:06.47	86	did not advance			
