= Tanzania at the 2017 World Aquatics Championships =

- Flag of Tanzania
- FINA code: TAN
- National federation: Tanzania Swimming Association

in Budapest, Hungary
- Competitors: 3 in 1 sport
- Medals: Gold 0 Silver 0 Bronze 0 Total 0

World Aquatics Championships appearances
- 1973; 1975; 1978; 1982; 1986; 1991; 1994; 1998; 2001; 2003; 2005; 2007; 2009; 2011; 2013; 2015; 2017; 2019; 2022; 2023; 2024

Tanzania competed at the 2017 World Aquatics Championships in Budapest, Hungary from 14 to 30 July.

== Swimming ==
Tanzania received a Universality invitation from FINA to send three swimmers (two men and one woman) to the World Championships.

Athlete	Event	Heat		Semifinal		Final	
Athlete	Event	Time	Rank	Time	Rank	Time	Rank
Adil Bharmal	Men's 100 m freestyle	56.68	96	did not advance			
Adil Bharmal	Men's 50 m breaststroke	32.67	70	did not advance			
Hilal Hemed Hilal	Men's 50 m freestyle	24.19	84	did not advance			
Hilal Hemed Hilal	Men's 50 m butterfly	26.40	63	did not advance			
Sonia Tumiotto	Women's 100 m freestyle	1:00.90	60	did not advance			
Sonia Tumiotto	Women's 200 m freestyle	2:11.01	43	did not advance			
