= East Africa High Commission =

1948 to 1961 international organisation

The East Africa High Commission (EAHC) was an international organisation which existed between 1 January 1948 and 9 December 1961 with the intention of providing common services to the British-administered Uganda, Kenya and Tanganyika. It superseded the East Africa Governors' Conference and was later replaced by the East African Common Services Organization (EACSO). The EACSO in turn was replaced by the first East African Community in 1967.

== History ==
During the Second World War, the British Governors of Uganda, Kenya and Tanganyika established several regional boards to help coordinate the war effort. Immediately after the end of the war, the British Government published "proposals for the future management of the inter-territorial services in East Africa", with revised proposals following in 1947. These resulted in the East Africa (High Commission) Order in Council 1947, which came into effect on 1 January 1948. The purpose of the High Commission was to create a single executive authority with competence in certain areas, without otherwise affecting the constitutional status of Uganda, Kenya and Tanganyika. It would be supported by an accompanying legislature (the Central Legislative Assembly). The 1947 proposals were received badly in Uganda, particularly in Buganda, where the Bataka Party drew successfully on fears that the High Commission would be a supergovernment controlled by Europeans. The creation of the High Commission thereby contributed to the 1949 riots, during which 1,724 Bugandans were arrested.

The High Commission comprised the Governors of the three territories and met two or three times a year under the chairmanship of the Governor of Kenya. It administered, among other things, the postal network, telecommunications, railways and ports, and oversaw the collection of certain taxes. Decisions were taken by unanimity. The secretariat was based in Nairobi and composed almost entirely of British civil servants. The High Commission was responsible for a number of subordinate bodies (including the East African Railways and Harbours Corporation and the East African Posts and Telecommunications Administration), indirectly employing 21,000 people. In 1960 the expenditures of these bodies totalled 125 million dollars.

In June 1961, during the process of decolonisation, representatives of Uganda, Kenya and Tanganyika met in London. They agreed to the creation of the East African Common Services Organization (EACSO), which could provide a similar function to the High Commission following decolonisation. The High Commission was formally replaced by EACSO (which was also headquartered in Nairobi) on 9 December 1961 when Tanganyika became the first of the three East African territories to become independent.

== Central Legislative Assembly ==
The East Africa (High Commission) Order in Council 1947 also created an East Africa Central Legislative Assembly. The Assembly comprised the principal executive officers of the High Commission, together with a number of nominated and unofficial members representing the legislatures of the Kenya, Uganda and Tanganyika. Legislation passed by the Assembly applied directly across the three territories.

=== List of speakers ===
- 1948: Sir Geoffry Alexander Stafford Northcote
- 1949–1953: Sir Henry Guy Pilling
- 1953–1961: Sir Vincent Goncalves Glenday

== See also ==
- East African Community
