= Tanzania at the 2011 World Aquatics Championships =

- Flag of Tanzania
- FINA code: TAN
- National federation: Tanzania Swimming Association

in Shanghai, China
- Competitors: 3 in 1 sport
- Medals: Gold 0 Silver 0 Bronze 0 Total 0

World Aquatics Championships appearances
- 1973; 1975; 1978; 1982; 1986; 1991; 1994; 1998; 2001; 2003; 2005; 2007; 2009; 2011; 2013; 2015; 2017; 2019; 2022; 2023; 2024

Tanzania competed at the 2011 World Aquatics Championships in Shanghai, China between July 16 and 31, 2011.

== Swimming ==
Tanzania qualified 3 swimmers.

Men

Athlete	Event	Heats		Semifinals		Final	
Athlete	Event	Time	Rank	Time	Rank	Time	Rank
Ammaar Ghadiyali	Men's 50m Freestyle	29.23	103	did not advance			
Ammaar Ghadiyali	Men's 100m Freestyle	1:03.98	99	did not advance			

Women

Athlete	Event	Heats		Semifinals		Final	
Athlete	Event	Time	Rank	Time	Rank	Time	Rank
Magdalena Moshi	Women's 50m Freestyle	30.01	61	did not advance			
Magdalena Moshi	Women's 100m Freestyle	1:05.39	64	did not advance			
Gouri Kotecha	Women's 100m Freestyle	DNS		did not advance			
Gouri Kotecha	Women's 200m Freestyle	DNS		did not advance			
