= Tanzania at the 2013 World Aquatics Championships =

- Flag of Tanzania
- FINA code: TAN
- National federation: Tanzania Swimming Association

in Barcelona, Spain
- Competitors: 3 in 1 sport
- Medals: Gold 0 Silver 0 Bronze 0 Total 0

World Aquatics Championships appearances
- 1973; 1975; 1978; 1982; 1986; 1991; 1994; 1998; 2001; 2003; 2005; 2007; 2009; 2011; 2013; 2015; 2017; 2019; 2022; 2023; 2024

Tanzania competed at the 2013 World Aquatics Championships in Barcelona, Spain between 19 July and 4 August 2013.

== Swimming ==
Tanzanian swimmers achieved qualifying standards in the following events (up to a maximum of 2 swimmers in each event at the A-standard entry time, and 1 at the B-standard):

Men

Athlete	Event	Heat		Semifinal		Final	
Athlete	Event	Time	Rank	Time	Rank	Time	Rank
Ammaar Ghadiyali	100 m freestyle	59.96	78	did not advance			
Ammaar Ghadiyali	200 m freestyle	2:15.28	69	did not advance			
Hilal Hemed Hilal	50 m freestyle	25.64	74	did not advance			
Hilal Hemed Hilal	50 m butterfly	28.25	71	did not advance			

Women

Athlete	Event	Heat		Semifinal		Final	
Athlete	Event	Time	Rank	Time	Rank	Time	Rank
Mariam Foum	50 m freestyle	29.86	66	did not advance			
Mariam Foum	50 m breaststroke	38.21	68	did not advance			
