= List of Tanzanian records in swimming =

The Tanzanian records in swimming are the fastest ever performances of swimmers from Tanzania, which are recognised and ratified by the Tanzanian Swimming Federation.

== Long Course (50 m) ==
=== Men ===
Event	Time		Name	Club	Date	Meet	Location	Ref
50 m freestyle	23.70	h	Hilal Hemed Hilal	Tanzania	11 August 2016	Olympic Games	Rio de Janeiro, Brazil	
100 m freestyle	52.52	h	Collins Saliboko	Tanzania	11 April 2025	South African Championships	Gqeberha, South Africa	
200 m freestyle	1:56.09	h	Collins Saliboko	Tanzania	9 April 2025	South African Championships	Gqeberha, South Africa	
400 m freestyle								
800 m freestyle								
1500 m freestyle								
50 m backstroke	28.31	h	Collins Saliboko	Tanzania	24 July 2026	Commonwealth Games	Glasgow, United Kingdom	
100 m backstroke	1:01.22	rh	Collins Saliboko	Eastern Cape	18 April 2026	South African Championships	Gqeberha, South Africa	
200 m backstroke	2:25.36		Aliasgher Kurban	Tanzania	4 April 2016	6th Dubai International Championships	Dubai, United Arab Emirates	
50 m breaststroke	32.67	h	Adil Bharmal	Tanzania	25 July 2017	World Championships	Budapest, Hungary	
100 m breaststroke								
200 m breaststroke								
50 m butterfly	25.67	=	Saliboko Collins	Tanzania	21 August 2022	African Championships	Tunis, Tunisia	
50 m butterfly	25.67	h, =	Saliboko Collins	Tanzania	28 July 2026	Commonwealth Games	Glasgow, United Kingdom	
100 m butterfly	57.06		Collins Saliboko	Tanzania	5 May 2023	CANA Zone IV Championships	Luanda, Angola	
200 m butterfly	2:11.16		Collins Saliboko	Tanzania	6 May 2023	CANA Zone IV Championships	Luanda, Angola	
200 m individual medley								
400 m individual medley	5:13.89		Collins Saliboko	Tanzania	8 May 2026	African Championships	Oran, Algeria	
4×50 m freestyle relay	1:43.75			Tanzania	19 October 2025	Africa Aquatics Zone III Championships	Nairobi, Kenya	
4×100 m freestyle relay	3:59.39			Tanzania	6 December 2023	African Junior Championships	Mauritius, Mauritius	
4×200 m freestyle relay								
4×50 m medley relay	1:57.71			Tanzania	16 October 2025	Africa Aquatics Zone III Championships	Nairobi, Kenya	
4×100 m medley relay	4:19.29		Romeo Harry (1:03.37); Delbert Panya (1:16.74); Aryan Bhattbhatt (1:00.74); Michael Mponezya Joseph (58.44)	Tanzania	9 September 2023	World Junior Championships	Netanya, Israel	

Legend: # – Record awaiting ratification by Tanzanian Swimming Federation; WR – World record; AF – African record;
Records not set in finals: h – heat; sf – semifinal; r – relay 1st leg; rh – relay heat 1st leg; b – B final; † – en route to final mark; so – swim-off; tt – time trial

=== Women ===
Event	Time		Name	Club	Date	Meet	Location	Ref
50 m freestyle	27.58		Crissa Dillip	Tanzania	9 May 2026	African Championships	Oran, Algeria	
100 m freestyle	1:00.90	h	Sonia Tumiotto	Tanzania	27 July 2017	World Championships	Budapest, Hungary	
200 m freestyle	2:11.01	h	Sonia Tumiotto	Tanzania	25 July 2017	World Championships	Budapest, Hungary	
400 m freestyle	4:49.40		Sonia Tumiotto	Tanzania	5 April 2016	6th Dubai International Championships	Dubai, United Arab Emirates	
800 m freestyle								
1500 m freestyle								
50 m backstroke	30.54		Crissa Dillip	Tanzania	7 May 2026	African Championships	Oran, Algeria	
100 m backstroke	1:08.86	h	Crissa Dillip	Tanzania	8 May 2026	African Championships	Oran, Algeria	
200 m backstroke	2:30.18		Crissa Dillip	High Performance Training	15 February 2026	Dubai Open Championships	Dubai, United Arab Emirates	
50 m breaststroke	37.26	h	Bridget Heep	Tanzania	19 August 2025	Junior World Championships	Otopeni, Romania	
100 m breaststroke								
200 m breaststroke								
50 m butterfly	30.46		Sonia Tumiotto	Tanzania	6 April 2016	6th Dubai International Championships	Dubai, United Arab Emirates	
100 m butterfly	1:12.17	h	Sophia Latiff	Tanzania	11 March 2024	African Games	Accra, Ghana	
200 m butterfly								
200 m individual medley								
400 m individual medley								
4×50 m freestyle relay	1:55.28			Tanzania	19 October 2025	Africa Aquatics Zone III Championships	Nairobi, Kenya	
4×100 m freestyle relay	4:30.15			Tanzania	October 2025	Africa Aquatics Zone III Championships	Nairobi, Kenya	
4×200 m freestyle relay								
4×50 m medley relay	2:20.00			Tanzania	16 October 2025	Africa Aquatics Zone III Championships	Nairobi, Kenya	
4×100 m medley relay								

Legend: # – Record awaiting ratification by Tanzanian Swimming Federation; WR – World record; AF – African record;
Records not set in finals: h – heat; sf – semifinal; r – relay 1st leg; rh – relay heat 1st leg; b – B final; † – en route to final mark; so – swim-off; tt – time trial

=== Mixed relay ===
Event	Time		Name	Club	Date	Meet	Location	Ref
4×50 m freestyle relay	1:52.84			Tanzania	17 October 2025	Africa Aquatics Zone III Championships	Nairobi, Kenya	
4×100 m freestyle relay								
4×50 m medley relay	2:01.85			Tanzania	17 October 2025	Africa Aquatics Zone III Championships	Nairobi, Kenya	
4×100 m medley relay	4:33.86	h		Tanzania	20 August 2025	Junior World Championships	Otopeni, Romania	

Legend: # – Record awaiting ratification by Tanzanian Swimming Federation;
Records not set in finals: h – heat; so – swim-off

== Short Course (25 m) ==
=== Men ===
Event	Time		Name	Club	Date	Meet	Location	Ref
50 m freestyle	23.21		Hilal Hemed Hilal	-				
100 m freestyle	52.88	h	Hilal Hemed Hilal	Tanzania	15 December 2018	World Championships	Hangzhou, China	
200 m freestyle	2:03.82		Philip Saliboko	Tanzania	19 October 2017	CANA Zone III Championships	Dar es Salaam, Tanzania	
400 m freestyle	4:30.87		Philip Saliboko	Tanzania	19 October 2017	CANA Zone III Championships	Dar es Salaam, Tanzania	
800 m freestyle	10:22.98		Joseph Sumari	Tanzania	18 October 2017	CANA Zone III Championships	Dar es Salaam, Tanzania	
1500 m freestyle								
50 m backstroke	29.14	tt	Aliasger Karimjee	Saint Felix School	7 November 2015	East Region Championships	Luton, Great Britain	
100 m backstroke	1:04.48		Philip Saliboko	-				
200 m backstroke	2:17.90	tt	Aliasger Karimjee	Saint Felix School	November 2015	East Region Championships	Luton, Great Britain	
50 m breaststroke	31.06		Hilal Hemed Hilal	Tanzania	18 October 2017	CANA Zone III Championships	Dar es Salaam, Tanzania	
100 m breaststroke	1:09.77		Hilal Hemed Hilal	-				
200 m breaststroke	2:50.50		Harry McIntosh	Tanzania	19 October 2017	CANA Zone III Championships	Dar es Salaam, Tanzania	
50 m butterfly	25.96	h	Hilal Hemed Hilal	Tanzania	9 December 2016	World Championships	Windsor, Canada	
100 m butterfly	58.39	h	Collins Saliboko	Tanzania	12 December 2018	World Championships	Hangzhou, China	
200 m butterfly	2:18.10		Philip Saliboko	Tanzania	20 October 2017	CANA Zone III Championships	Dar es Salaam, Tanzania	
100 m individual medley	1:02.64		Hilal Hemed Hilal	-				
200 m individual medley	2:24.51		Philip Saliboko					
400 m individual medley								
4×50m freestyle relay	1:38.86		Dennis Mhini; Philip Saliboko; Adil Bharmal; Hilal Hemed Hilal	Tanzania	20 October 2017	CANA Zone III Championships	Dar es Salaam, Tanzania	
4×100m freestyle relay	3:38.89		Collins Saliboko; Aryan BhattBhatt; Romeo-Mihaly Mwaipasi; Michael Joseph	Tanzania	25 November 2023	Africa Aquatics Zone III Championships	Kigali, Rwanda	
4×200 m freestyle relay								
4×50 m medley relay								
4×100 m medley relay								

Legend: # – Record awaiting ratification by Tanzanian Swimming Federation; WR – World record; AF – African record;
Records not set in finals: h – heat; sf – semifinal; r – relay 1st leg; rh – relay heat 1st leg; b – B final; † – en route to final mark; so – swim-off; tt – time trial

=== Women ===
Event	Time	Name	Club	Date	Meet	Location	Ref
50m freestyle	27.34	Sonia Tumiotto	-				
100m freestyle	59.77	Sonia Tumiotto	-				
200m freestyle	2:08.58	Sonia Tumiotto	-				
400m freestyle	4:29.57	Sonia Tumiotto	-				
800m freestyle	9:18.66	Sonia Tumiotto	-				
1500 m freestyle							
50m backstroke	31.59	Sonia Tumiotto	-				
100m backstroke	1:08.09	Sonia Tumiotto	-				
200m backstroke	2:32.39	Sonia Tumiotto	Tanzania	19 October 2017	CANA Zone III Championships	Dar es Salaam, Tanzania	
50m breaststroke	36.20	Emma Imhoff	Tanzania	18 October 2017	CANA Zone III Championships	Dar es Salaam, Tanzania	
100m breaststroke	1:21.52	Emma Imhoff	Tanzania	19 October 2017	CANA Zone III Championships	Dar es Salaam, Tanzania	
200m breaststroke	2:58.70	Smriti Gokarn	Tanzania	19 October 2017	CANA Zone III Championships	Dar es Salaam, Tanzania	
50m butterfly	29.84	Natalie Sanford	Tanzania	19 October 2017	CANA Zone III Championships	Dar es Salaam, Tanzania	
100m butterfly	1:07.98	Natalie Sanford	Tanzania	19 October 2017	CANA Zone III Championships	Dar es Salaam, Tanzania	
200m butterfly	2:38.66	Natalie Sanford	Tanzania	20 October 2017	CANA Zone III Championships	Dar es Salaam, Tanzania	
100m individual medley	1:09.15	Sonia Tumiotto	Tanzania	18 October 2017	CANA Zone III Championships	Dar es Salaam, Tanzania	
200m individual medley	2:27.65	Sonia Tumiotto					
400 m individual medley							
4×50m freestyle relay	1:55.04		-				
4×100m freestyle relay	4:10.63		-				
4×200 m freestyle relay							
4×50 m medley relay							
4×100 m medley relay							

Legend: # – Record awaiting ratification by Tanzanian Swimming Federation; WR – World record; AF – African record;
Records not set in finals: h – heat; sf – semifinal; r – relay 1st leg; rh – relay heat 1st leg; b – B final; † – en route to final mark; so – swim-off; tt – time trial

=== Mixed relay ===
Event	Time	Name	Club	Date	Meet	Location	Ref
4×50 m freestyle relay							
4×50 m medley relay	1:58.29	Sonia Tumiotto; Hilal Hemed Hilal; Philip Saliboko; Emma Imhoff	Tanzania	18 October 2017	CANA Zone III Championships	Dar es Salaam, Tanzania	

Legend: # – Record awaiting ratification by Tanzanian Swimming Federation;
Records not set in finals: h – heat; so – swim-off
