= Guy Pilling =

British colonial administrator

Sir Henry Guy Pilling, KCMG (1886 – 13 June 1953) was a British colonial administrator. He was Governor of St Helena from 1938 to 1941 and the British Resident in Zanzibar from 1941 to 1946. In retirement, he served as Speaker of the East Africa Central Legislative Assembly from 1949 until his death.

== Biography ==
Born in East Dereham, Pilling was educated at The King's School, Ely and Keble College, Oxford. He joined the Colonial Service as a cadet in 1907 in Fiji. In 1921, he became Assistant Colonial Secretary of Fiji. In 1929, he was appointed Assistant to the High Commissioner for the Western Pacific, before being appointed Colonial Secretary of British Honduras the same year. In 1934, he was transferred to Kenya as Colonial Secretary.

In 1937, Pilling was appointed Governor and Commander-in-Chief of Saint Helena, and in 1941 he became British Resident in Zanzibar. He retired from the Colonial Service in 1946.

After his retirement, Pilling was elected Speaker of the East Africa Central Legislative Assembly in 1949 and served until his death.

Pilling was appointed CMG in 1932 and promoted to KCMG in 1941. He also received the First Class of the Order of the Brilliant Star of Zanzibar.
