= Tanzania at the 2024 World Aquatics Championships =

- Flag of Tanzania
- FINA code: TAN
- National federation: Tanzania Swimming Association

in Doha, Qatar
- Competitors: 4 in 1 sport
- Medals: Gold 0 Silver 0 Bronze 0 Total 0

World Aquatics Championships appearances
- 1973; 1975; 1978; 1982; 1986; 1991; 1994; 1998; 2001; 2003; 2005; 2007; 2009; 2011; 2013; 2015; 2017; 2019; 2022; 2023; 2024

Tanzania competed at the 2024 World Aquatics Championships in Doha, Qatar from 2 to 18 February.

== Competitors ==
The following is the list of competitors in the Championships.

Sport	Men	Women	Total
Swimming	2	2	4
Total	2	2	4

== Swimming ==
Tanzania entered 4 swimmers.

Men

Athlete	Event	Heat		Semifinal		Final	
Athlete	Event	Time	Rank	Time	Rank	Time	Rank
Ethan Alimanya	50 metre breaststroke	34.26	54	Did not advance			
Ethan Alimanya	50 metre butterfly	30.07	61	Did not advance			
Michael Joseph	50 metre freestyle	25.94	90	Did not advance			
Michael Joseph	100 metre freestyle	57.30	93	Did not advance			

Women

Athlete	Event	Heat		Semifinal		Final	
Athlete	Event	Time	Rank	Time	Rank	Time	Rank
Amylia Chali	50 metre butterfly	33.14	51	Did not advance			
Amylia Chali	100 metre butterfly	1:19.92	44	Did not advance			
Natalia Ladha	50 metre freestyle	31.37	93	Did not advance			
Natalia Ladha	100 metre backstroke	1:13.56	54	Did not advance			
