= Sylvia Caloiaro =

Tanzanian swimmer

Personal information
- Born: 14 March 2001 (age 25)

Sport
- Sport: Swimming

Sylvia Caloiaro (born 14 March 2001) is a Tanzanian swimmer.

She represented Tanzania at the 2019 World Aquatics Championships held in Gwangju, South Korea. She competed in the women's 50 metre freestyle event. She did not advance to compete in the semi-finals. She also competed in the women's 50 metre breaststroke event and in this event she also did not advance to compete in the semi-finals.
