= Tanzania at the 2019 World Aquatics Championships =

- Flag of Tanzania
- FINA code: TAN
- National federation: Tanzania Swimming Association

in Gwangju, South Korea
- Competitors: 4 in 1 sport
- Medals: Gold 0 Silver 0 Bronze 0 Total 0

World Aquatics Championships appearances
- 1973; 1975; 1978; 1982; 1986; 1991; 1994; 1998; 2001; 2003; 2005; 2007; 2009; 2011; 2013; 2015; 2017; 2019; 2022; 2023; 2024

Tanzania competed at the 2019 World Aquatics Championships in Gwangju, South Korea from 12 to 28 July.

== Swimming ==
Tanzania entered four swimmers.

Men

Athlete	Event	Heat		Semifinal		Final	
Athlete	Event	Time	Rank	Time	Rank	Time	Rank
Hilal Hilal	50 m freestyle	25.01	94	did not advance			
Hilal Hilal	50 m butterfly	27.13	71	did not advance			
Collins Saliboko	100 m butterfly	58.82	68	did not advance			
Collins Saliboko	200 m butterfly	DSQ		did not advance			

Women

Athlete	Event	Heat		Semifinal		Final	
Athlete	Event	Time	Rank	Time	Rank	Time	Rank
Shivani Bhatt	50 m backstroke	38.96	48	did not advance			
Shivani Bhatt	100 m backstroke	1:24.04	63	did not advance			
Sylvia Caloiaro	50 m freestyle	31.51	89	did not advance			
Sylvia Caloiaro	50 m breaststroke	42.30	50	did not advance			
