= Tanzania at the 2023 World Aquatics Championships =

- Flag of Tanzania
- FINA code: TAN
- National federation: Tanzania Swimming Association

in Fukuoka, Japan
- Competitors: 4 in 1 sport
- Medals: Gold 0 Silver 0 Bronze 0 Total 0

World Aquatics Championships appearances
- 1973; 1975; 1978; 1982; 1986; 1991; 1994; 1998; 2001; 2003; 2005; 2007; 2009; 2011; 2013; 2015; 2017; 2019; 2022; 2023; 2024

Tanzania is set to compete at the 2023 World Aquatics Championships in Fukuoka, Japan from 14 to 30 July.

== Swimming ==
Tanzania entered 4 swimmers.

Men

Athlete	Event	Heat		Semifinal		Final	
Athlete	Event	Time	Rank	Time	Rank	Time	Rank
Hilal Hilal	50 metre breaststroke	Disqualified		Did not advance			
Hilal Hilal	50 metre butterfly	27.68	74	Did not advance			
Collins Saliboko	50 metre freestyle	24.43	78	Did not advance			
Collins Saliboko	100 metre freestyle	53.30	83	Did not advance			

Women

Athlete	Event	Heat		Semifinal		Final	
Athlete	Event	Time	Rank	Time	Rank	Time	Rank
Sophia Latiff	50 metre freestyle	28.34	70	Did not advance			
Sophia Latiff	100 metre freestyle	1:04.47	66	Did not advance			
Ria Save	50 metre backstroke	34.71	55	Did not advance			
Ria Save	50 metre breaststroke	40.30	46	Did not advance			

Mixed

Athlete	Event	Heat		Final	
Athlete	Event	Time	Rank	Time	Rank
Ria Save; Hilal Hilal; Collins Saliboko; Sophia Latiff	4 × 100 m medley relay	4:37.35	39	Did not advance	
