= East African Common Services Organisation =

The East African Common Services Organisation (EACSO) was a common market established in 1961 between Kenya, Tanzania, and Uganda to supersede the colonial East Africa High Commission during the independence of each country. It was intended to be eventually replaced by an East African Federation, but this never occurred. It began to come apart in 1965, and was superseded by the East African Community in 1967.

== Organization ==
The EACSO was headed by a Central Legislative Assembly, with executive power vested in a Secretary-General. The other members of the Central Legislative Assembly were the Legal Secretary, the twelve members of the ministerial committees, and nine members elected by the legislature of each of the three nations. It also featured a Common Services Authority, which initially consisted of the Chief Ministers of each region, but later consisted of the President of each country.

Four ministerial committees were responsible for policy. Each of the committees had three members, one representing each nation, and so were also known as triumvirates. These committees were:

- the Commercial and Industrial Co-ordination Committee,
- the Communications Committee,
- the Finance Committee, and
- the Social and Research Services Committee.

== History ==
The East Africa High Commission had been established by the British in 1948 in order to administer inter-territorial services in British East Africa. In 1961, with the independence of Tanganyika planned for that December and the subsequent independences of the rest of East Africa on the horizon, a new organization was required in order to maintain both the common services previously administered by the High Commission as well as national sovereignty. Talks were held in London in June 1961 to determine the future of the High Commission, and as a consequence the EACSO was established on December 9, 1961, the same day as Tanganyika became independent. The initial charter of the EACSO provided for a centralised administration administering transportation, tax collection, and education and research, as well as a common currency and a common appellate court system. It was intended to be replaced by an East African Federation, but this never occurred.

With Uganda's independence in 1962, the EACSO had as its principal members Tanganyika, Uganda, and the United Kingdom (as Kenya was not yet an independent nation). Following the independence of Kenya in 1963, it joined the organisation as a full member.

During the operation of the EACSO, tariffs were laid in common on external trade, and trade barriers were initially removed on inter-territorial trade. However, in 1964, Tanganyikan President Julius Nyerere threatened to pull out of the organisation due to concerns that this arrangement unduly benefited Kenya. Ultimately, some trade barriers were imposed by the Kampala Agreement of 29 April 1964. The agreement gave each of the nations the exclusive right to manufacture certain goods (such as Land Rover vehicles for Tanganyika, fluorescent lamps for Kenya, or fertilizer for Uganda), as well as introducing import and export quotas between the three nations. Ultimately, however, the nations did not implement most of the agreement's provisions, though Tanganyika remained a member of the EACSO.

The unification of Tanganyika with Zanzibar in 1964 resulted in the EACSO being between Kenya, Tanzania, and Uganda.

The EACSO began to come apart in 1965 due to nationalist tensions. In particular, Tanzania and Uganda had significant concerns about Kenyan domination of the EACSO. Attempts to establish a East African Central Bank failed, with each of the three nations establishing their own central banks in 1966; ultimately, a common currency was also abandoned, with each nation having its own currency.

In order to resolve the inter-territorial issues in the EACSO, the Phillips Commission was appointed in 1967 to determine the best way to reduce trade imbalances and accelerate the development of Tanzania and Uganda, while maintaining good relations with the three nations. As a result of the commission's report, in June 1967, the presidents of Kenya, Tanzania, and Uganda signed the Treaty for East African Co-operation, causing the EACSO to be superseded by the East African Community on December 1, 1967.
