= Tanzania at the 2022 World Aquatics Championships =

- Flag of Tanzania
- FINA code: TAN
- National federation: Tanzania Swimming Association

in Budapest, Hungary
- Competitors: 4 in 1 sport
- Medals: Gold 0 Silver 0 Bronze 0 Total 0

World Aquatics Championships appearances
- 1973; 1975; 1978; 1982; 1986; 1991; 1994; 1998; 2001; 2003; 2005; 2007; 2009; 2011; 2013; 2015; 2017; 2019; 2022; 2023; 2024

Tanzania competed at the 2022 World Aquatics Championships in Budapest, Hungary from 18 June to 3 July.

== Swimming ==
Tanzanian swimmers have achieved qualifying standards in the following events.

Athlete	Event	Heat		Semifinal		Final	
Athlete	Event	Time	Rank	Time	Rank	Time	Rank
Dennis Mhini	Men's 50 m freestyle	25.44	73	did not advance			
Dennis Mhini	Men's 100 m backstroke	1:04.71	46	did not advance			
Collins Saliboko	Men's 100 m freestyle	53.90	76	did not advance			
Collins Saliboko	Men's 100 m butterfly	57.90	54	did not advance			
Eunike Mathayo	Women's 50 m freestyle	31.06	73	did not advance			
Eunike Mathayo	Women's 50 m breaststroke	42.26	53	did not advance			
Kayla Temba	Women's 100 m freestyle	1:18.35	62	did not advance			
Kayla Temba	Women's 50 m backstroke	39.30	39	did not advance			
Eunike Mathayo; Dennis Mhini; Collins Saliboko; Kayla Temba	4 × 100 m mixed freestyle relay	DSQ		—		did not advance	
