= Jetha Lila =

Private bank

Jetha Lila was a private bank established in Zanzibar that traced its origins to 1880. It was an anomaly in East Africa in that it was local in origin, all other banks being foreign with headquarters outside the region, primarily in the United Kingdom.

In 1880, Jetha Liladhar, a merchant of a Bombay Bhatia family, founded the firm to operate as commission agents. The firm added money-changing to its activities in 1910. In 1920 the Westminster Bank appointed Jetha Lila its agent to represent its interests in Zanzibar. Finally, in 1933 the Zanzibar government issued Jetha Lila a trading licence to permit it to operate as a bank. The bank continued to operate through the 1964 revolution in Zanzibar that led to the overthrow of Sultan Jamshid bin Abdullah and a subsequent merger with Tanganyika to form the nation of Tanzania. In the aftermath of the revolution Jetha Lila's primary clients left the island and in 1968 the bank ceased operations, despite the Revolutionary government urging it to stay.
