= Charles Euan-Smith =

British soldier and diplomat

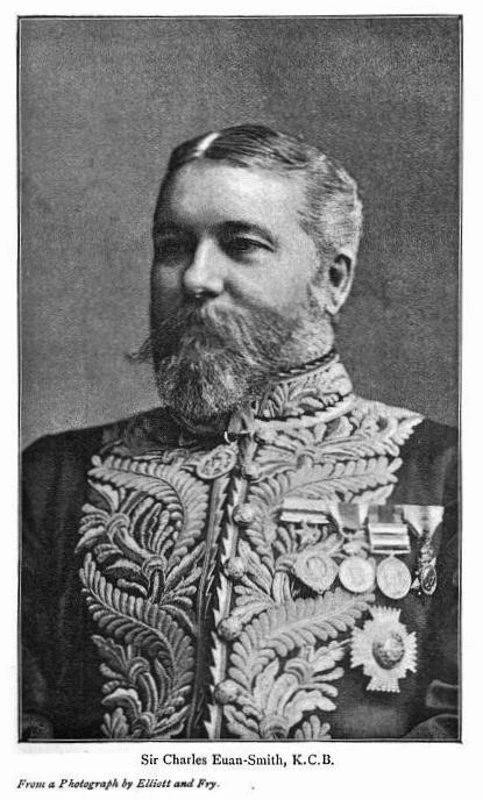
Sir Charles Euan-Smith in court dress

Sir Charles Euan-Smith KCB CSI (21 September 1842 – 30 August 1910) was a British soldier and diplomat.

== Career ==
Charles Bean Smith (he added Euan to his surname later) was the son of Dr Euan McLaurin Smith, of Georgetown, British Guiana, and his wife Elisa Bean. After being educated privately in England and Belgium he joined the Madras Army at the age of 17 as an ensign and was promoted to lieutenant in 1861. He took part in the 1868 Expedition to Abyssinia, was present at the capture of Maqdala and received the campaign medal. He was promoted to captain in 1870 and was secretary to Sir Frederic Goldsmid's special commission in 1871 for the delimitation of the Baluch frontier with Persia. He was given the temporary rank of major when he accompanied Sir Bartle Frere on his expedition to Zanzibar in 1872 to negotiate a treaty with the Sultan for the suppression of the slave traffic.

In August 1879 Euan-Smith was appointed consul at Muscat but he left shortly afterwards to join the Second Anglo-Afghan War as chief political officer on the staff of Lieutenant-General Sir Donald Stewart. He took part in Lord Roberts' expedition to lift the Siege of Kandahar. He was promoted to lieutenant-colonel in 1881 and full colonel in 1885 (he formally retired from the army in 1889).

In 1887 he was appointed Her Majesty's Agent and Consul-General for the Dominions of the Sultan of Zanzibar. In February 1890 the Sultan died and Euan-Smith took advantage of the situation to persuade the new Sultan, Ali bin Said, that Zanzibar should be a British protectorate. This resulted in the so-called Heligoland–Zanzibar Treaty of July 1890 in which Germany and the United Kingdom agreed on territorial interests in East Africa.

In 1891 he was appointed "Envoy Extraordinary and Minister Plenipotentiary to the Emperor of Morocco", based in Tangier. In 1892 he travelled to Fez, the capital, in the hope of concluding a commercial treaty, and an agreement to end slavery. After disagreements with the Sultan, the mission failed and no treaty or agreement was signed. Euan-Smith was relieved of his post in 1893.

In 1898 he was appointed "Her Majesty's Minister Resident in the Republic of Colombia, and also to be Her Majesty's Consul-General in that Republic". However, he resigned without taking up the post.

== Publications ==
- Eastern Persia: An Account of the Journeys of the Persian Boundary Commission, 1870-71-72 (with Sir Frederic Goldsmid, Sir Oliver St John, Beresford Lovett, William Blanford), Macmillan and Company, 1876

== Offices held ==
Diplomatic posts
Preceded by Sir William Kirby Green	Envoy Extraordinary and Minister Plenipotentiary to the Emperor of Morocco; 1891–1893	Succeeded by Ernest Satow
Preceded by George Jenner	Minister Resident in the Republic of Colombia; 1898–1898	Succeeded by George Welby
