= Richard Rankine =

British colonial administrator

Sir Richard Sims Donkin Rankine, KCMG (1875 – 24 June 1961) was a British colonial administrator. He was the British Resident in Zanzibar from 1930 to 1937.
