= Sonia Tumiotto =

Tanzanian swimmer

- Born: 14 July 2001 (age 25); Tanzania
- Education: Nottingham Trent University

Sonia Tumiotto (born 14 July 2001) is a Tanzanian athlete and influencer who participated in competitive swimming events in the late 2010s. She competed in the women's 100 metre freestyle and the women's 200 metre freestyle events at the 2017 World Aquatics Championships. In 2018, she competed in the girls' 100 metre freestyle event at the 2018 Summer Youth Olympics held in Buenos Aires, Argentina. She did not advance to compete in the semi-finals. She also competed in the girls' 200 metre freestyle event.

She is of mixed Italian and Tanzanian Indian descent. She holds a bachelor of science degree in psychology.
