= Henry Steven Potter =

Sir Henry Steven Potter KCMG (7 March 1904 – 14 November 1976) was a British administrator who served as British Resident in Zanzibar between 1954 and 1959.

== Biography ==
Potter was educated at Shrewsbury School and Queens' College, Cambridge. On completion of his studies he joined the Colonial Service and served as a district officer in Kenya between 1926-44. In 1944 he became Deputy Financial Secretary for Kenya, and the following year Financial Secretary for Uganda. He became Chief Secretary of Uganda in 1948 and later Kenya in 1952.

In 1954 he was appointed British Resident for Zanzibar and remained in the post until his retirement in 1959. He was made a Knight Commander of the Order of St Michael and St George in 1956.
