= Vincent Glenday =

British colonial administrator

Sir Vincent Goncalves Glenday, KCMG, OBE (11 February 1891 – 30 April 1970) was a British colonial administrator. He was the Governor of Somaliland Protectorate from 1939 until the Italian occupation and British Resident in Zanzibar from 1946 to 1951.
