= Ammaar Ghadiyali =

Tanzanian swimmer (born 1997)

Personal information
- Born: May 30, 1997 (age 29) Dar es Salaam, Tanzania

Sport
- Sport: Swimming

Ammaar Shabbir Ghadiyali (born 30 May 1997) is a Tanzanian swimmer. At the 2012 Summer Olympics, he competed in the Men's 100 metre freestyle, finishing in 55th place overall in the heats, failing to qualify for the semifinals. He also competed in the 200 metre event at the 2013 World Aquatics Championships. In 2014, he represented Tanzania at the 2014 Summer Youth Olympics held in Nanjing, China.

Ammaar attended the International Baccaleaureate program at Bayview Secondary School in Richmond Hill, Ontario, Canada. He graduated in 2015. He now attends Toronto Metropolitan University for Business Management.
