= Flag of Tanzania =

United Republic of Tanzania
- Use: National flag, civil and state ensign
- Proportion: 2:3
- Adopted: 30 June 1964; 62 years ago
- Design: A golden-edged black diagonal band divided diagonally from the lower hoist-side corner: the upper triangle is green and the lower triangle is light blue.
- Presidential Standard of Tanzania
- Proportion: 2:3
- Design: A green field with a blue border with the national coat of arms (without humans) imposed at the center.

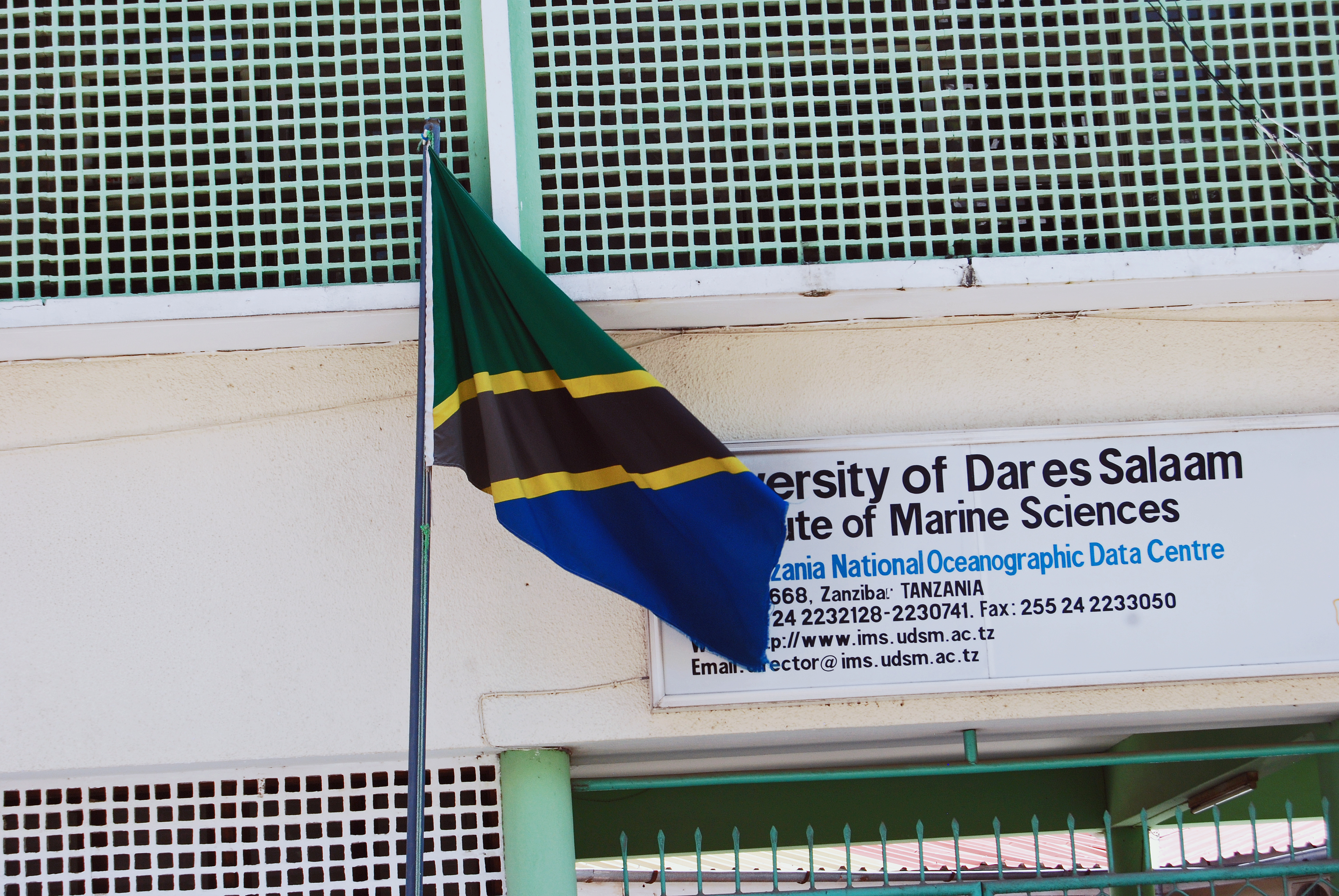
Tanzanian flag at the University of Dar es Salaam

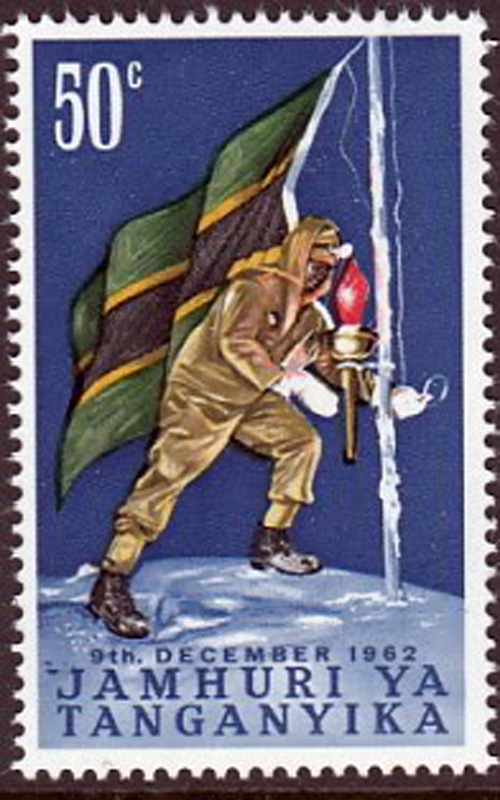
Mountaineer Alex Nyirenda atop Uhuru Peak with Tanganyika flag, on a Tanganyika stamp

The national flag of Tanzania (bendera ya Tanzania) consists of a gold-edged black bend, divided diagonally from the lower hoist-side corner, with a green upper triangle and light blue lower triangle. Adopted in 1964 to replace the individual flags of Tanganyika and Zanzibar, it has been the flag of the United Republic of Tanzania since the two states merged that year. The design of the present flag incorporates the elements from the two former flags. It is one of a relatively small number of national flags incorporating a diagonal line (heraldic bend, bend sinister), with other examples including the DR Congo, Republic of the Congo, Namibia, Saint Kitts and Nevis, Trinidad and Tobago and Brunei.

== History ==
The United Kingdom – together with its dominion South Africa and fellow Allied power Belgium – occupied the majority of German East Africa in 1916 during the East African Campaign. Three years later, the British were tasked with administering the Tanganyika Territory as a League of Nations mandate. It was turned into a UN Trust Territory after World War II, when the LN dissolved in 1946 and the United Nations was formed. In 1954, the Tanganyika African Association – which spoke out against British colonial rule – became the Tanganyika African National Union (TANU) under the leadership of Julius Nyerere and Oscar Kambona. The aim of the political party was to attain independence for the territory; its flag was a tricolour consisting of three horizontal green, black and yellow bands. Shortly before independence in 1961, elections were held in Tanganyika. After the TANU won comprehensively, the British colonial leaders advised them to utilise the design of their party's flag as inspiration for a new national flag. As a result, yellow stripes were added, and Tanganyika became independent on 9 December 1961.

The Sultanate of Zanzibar – which was a British protectorate until 1963 – used a red flag during its reign over the island. The last sultan was overthrown in the Zanzibar Revolution on 12 January 1964, and the Afro-Shirazi Party – the ruling political party of the newly formed People's Republic of Zanzibar – adopted a national flag the next month that was inspired by its own party flag. This consisted of a tricolour with three horizontal blue, black and green bands.

In April 1964, both Tanganyika and Zanzibar united in order to form a single country – the United Republic of Tanzania. Consequently, the flag designs of the two states were amalgamated to establish a new national flag. The green and black colours from the flag of Tanganyika were retained along with the blue from Zanzibar's flag, with a diagonal design used "for distinctiveness". This combined design was adopted on 30 June 1964. It was featured on the first set of stamps issued by the newly unified country. Since 2005, Zanzibar has also used its own regional flag: a horizontal arrangement of blue, black, and green with the national flag of Tanzania in the canton. The design reflects Zanzibar’s identity within the union while maintaining visual ties to Tanzania’s national colours.

== Design ==
=== Symbolism ===
The colors and symbols of the flag carry cultural, political, and regional meanings. The green alludes to the natural vegetation and "rich agricultural resources" of the country, while black represents the Swahili people who are native to Tanzania. The blue epitomizes the Indian Ocean, as well as the nation's numerous lakes and rivers. The thin stripes stand for Tanzania's mineral wealth, derived from the "rich deposits" in the land. While Whitney Smith in the Encyclopædia Britannica and Dorling Kindersley's Complete Flags of the World describe the fimbriations as yellow, other sources – such as The World Factbook and Simon Clarke in the journal Azania: Archaeological Research in Africa – contend that it is actually gold.

== Historical flags ==
Flag	Duration	Use	Description
	1885–1891	Flag of German East Africa	
	1891–1918	Flag of German East Africa	A horizontal black-white-red tricolour with the German Reichsadler in a white circle in the middle.
	1923–1961	Flag of Tanganyika Territory	A British Red Ensign with the Emblem of the British League of Nations mandate (a British UN Trust Territory after 1946) centred on the outer half of the flag.
	1961–1964	Flag of Tanganyika	A green field with a gold-edged black horizontal band in the centre.
	1505–1521	Flag of Portuguese Zanzibar	A white field with the coat of arms in the center.
	1521–1578	Flag of Portuguese Zanzibar	A white field with the coat of arms in the center.
	1578–1640	Flag of Portuguese Zanzibar	A white field with the coat of arms in the center.
	1640–1667	Flag of Portuguese Zanzibar	A white field with the coat of arms in the center.
	1667–1698	Flag of Portuguese Zanzibar	A white field with the coat of arms in the center.
	1698–1856	Flag of Zanzibar as a part of the Omani Empire	A plain red field.
	1856–1896	Flag of the Sultanate of Zanzibar	13 horizontal stripes. 4 red, 4 green, 2 white and 3 yellow with 8 green crescent moons. 3 in the superior and inferior yellow stripes and 2 in the central yellow stripe.
	1896–1963	Flag of the Sultanate of Zanzibar (British protectorate)	A plain red field.
	1963–1964	Flag of the Sultanate of Zanzibar	A red field with a green disk in the centre bearing two yellow cloves in the centre.
	12–29 January 1964	Flag of the People's Republic of Zanzibar	A horizontal tricolour of black, yellow and blue.
	29 January–26 April 1964	Flag of the People's Republic of Zanzibar	A horizontal tricolour of blue, black and green.

== See also ==
- Flag of Zanzibar
