= Golden (name) =

Golden is a surname that can be of English, Jewish or Irish origin. It can be a variant spelling of Golding. It is also sometimes a given name, generally male.

== Surname ==
- Al Golden (American football) (born 1969), American football coach
- Andrew Golden (1986–2019), American school shooter
- Anne Golden (born 1942), Canadian administrator
- Annie Golden (born 1951), American actress and singer
- Antonio Gandy-Golden (born 1998), American football player
- Arthur Golden (born 1956), American novelist
- Christopher Golden (born 1967), American author of horror, fantasy, and suspense novels
- Daniel Golden (born 1957), American journalist
- Dave Golden (born 1958), American musician
- Detric Golden (born 1977), American basketball player
- Diana Golden (actress), Colombian-Mexican actress
- Diana Golden (skier) (1963–2001), American disabled ski racer
- Eddie Golden, pro name for American wrestler Harold Edward Cox (born 1973)
- Eve Golden, American film journalist and biographer
- Grace Golden (1904–1993), English illustrator and historian
- Grant Golden (tennis) (1929–2018), American tennis player
- Grant Golden (basketball) (born 1998), American basketball player
- Harry Golden (1902–1981), American writer and publisher
- Howard Golden (1925–2024), American politician from New York
- James S. Golden (1891–1971), American politician from Kentucky
- Jane Golden, American mural artist
- Jared Golden (born 1982), American politician from Maine
- Jason Golden (born 1985), British rugby player
- Jeff Golden (born 1950), American activist and radio personality
- Jerry Golden (1923–2003), American broadcaster
- Jimmy Golden (born 1950), American wrestler
- John Golden (1874–1955), American actor and theatrical producer
- John Golden (pirate) (died 1694), English pirate
- John Golden (trade unionist) (1863–1921), American trade union leader
- Johnny Golden (1896–1936), American golfer
- Judith Golden (1934–2023), American photographer
- Lily Golden (1934–2010), Soviet and Russian historian and civil rights advocate
- Lotti Golden (born 1949), American singer-songwriter, record producer and poet
- Martin Golden (born 1950), American politician from New York
- Marvin Golden (born 1976), British rugby player
- Matthew Golden (born 2003), American football player
- Maurice Golden, Scottish politician
- Michael Golden (businessman), American newspaper publisher
- Mike Golden (baseball) (1851–1929), American professional baseball player
- Oliver Golden (1887–1940), American-born agronomist and politician
- Peter Allen Golden (born 1953), author
- Peter Benjamin Golden (born 1941), American historian
- Pop Golden, American football coach
- Rena Golden (1961–2013), American journalist
- Rolland Golden (1931–2019), American artist
- Ronnie Golden, British singer, guitarist and comedian
- Sherita Hill Golden, American physician
- Sterling Golden, early stage name for American wrestler Hulk Hogan (1953–2025)
- Thelma Golden (born 1965), American museum director
- Thelma Golden (softball) (1915–1980), Canadian softball pitcher
- Thomas L. Golden, American 19th-century gold miner
- Vicki Golden (born 1992), American motocross rider
- William A. Golden, American politician
- William Lee Golden, American country and gospel musician

== Given name ==
- Golden Brooks (born 1970), American actress
- Golden Cañedo (born 2002), Filipina singer and performer
- Golden Frinks (1920–2004), African-American civil rights activist
- Golden E. Johnson (1944–2010), American politician, attorney, and jurist
- Golden Johnson (born 1974), American boxer
- J. Golden Kimball (1853-1938), American religious leader
- Golden Lalchhuanmawia (born 1985), Indian cricketer
- Golden Mafwenta (born 2001), Zambian footballer
- Golden Magic (born 1990), Mexican wrestler
- Golden Mashata (born 2001), Zambian footballer
- Golden Mwila (born 1974), Zambian politician
- Golden Richards (1950-2024), American football player
- Golden Tate (born 1988), American football player
- Golden "Big" Wheeler (1929–1998), American blues musician
- Golden J. Zenon Jr. (1929–2006), American architect
- Golden (poet), American poet and artist

== See also ==
- Golden (disambiguation)
- Gold (disambiguation)
