= Friendship Flight '89 =

Friendship Flight '89 was an around-the-world journey arranged with hopes to improve Soviet-American relations.

On June 5, 1989, 11-year-old Anthony Aliengena followed by two chase planes carrying his family, journalists and his Soviet pen pal, Roman Tcheremnykh, took off John Wayne Airport in Orange County, California in a Cessna 210 Centurion, and had successfully returned home nearly seven weeks and 21,567 miles after. The around-the-world trip included good will stops in the Soviet Union, where Tony and his family met with top Soviet officials in the Kremlin. They presented a 1,000-foot scroll signed by more than 250,000 U.S. school children and a sackful of 75,000 pen-pal letters as good-will gestures from children in the United States to children in the Soviet Union. The message, addressed to Mikhail Gorbachev, read in part: "We have come to your country with warm hearts and open arms. With us we carry our message of friendship. As kids are leaders of tomorrow, we can work together for a better world. From our mountains and valleys to our deserts and rolling seas, we have signed this letter as a symbol of our bright hopes."

The project started when, after his record-setting flight across the United States in March 1988, Tony wrote Gorbachev to ask if he could fly to the Soviet Union. The Soviet Foundation for Social Inventions agreed to meet with Tony's father, Gary Aliengena, in Moscow to discuss the proposal. Permission was granted, and Tony became the first Westerner allowed to pilot a plane across the Soviet Union in a long time. "I basically received permission in the first two minutes of the meeting," Aliengena said.

The route was planned to include such places as Omsk, Tyumen, Bratsk, Mirnyi and Magadan, which were normally closed not only to foreigners but to most Soviet residents as well, either because of their closeness to the borders or because strategic manufacturing centers were located there. Residents of those towns had no chance of seeing Americans until then either.

Gennady Alferenko, chairman of the Foundation for Social Inventions, said the American boy represented freedom to Soviet children: "He is teaching our youngsters that the entire planet is our home. He will touch millions and millions of children and open the door for global communication. Before, my country was very closed. There was no chance to see other places. Traveling to other places and seeing other cultures used to be 'crazy ideas'. It's time now. Let's be crazy!"

Since many of the schoolchildren's friendship letters had already been published by the Soviet newspapers by the time Tony first landed in the Soviet Union, he, his parents and their entourage were very enthusiastically welcomed all across the country. They were greeted by Soviet children, journalists and officials, and given flowers, post cards and souvenirs. Performances and concerts were organized in their honor.

The significance of the friendship mission was particularly emphasized by the Scandinavian governments, which waived the customary rigorous clearance through customs for Tony and his entourage of 11 persons. In Norway and Sweden, government officials checked no passports and required only that Tony's father, Gary, and Dr. Lance Allyn, a Hanford, California surgeon who was piloting one of the chase planes, sign declarations that they were not bringing in anything illegal.

Los Angeles Times had been providing a detailed coverage of Tony's flight and stops across the world.

== Sources ==
- Tony Circles the Globe: Flight Was Turbulent Before the Takeoff', Los Angeles Times, June 25, 1989
