= Goolden =

Goolden is a surname of Anglo-Saxon origin. Notable people with the surname include:

- Francis Goolden (1885–1950), British Royal Navy officer
- Jilly Goolden (born 1949), English wine critic, journalist, and television personality
- Richard Goolden (1895–1981), British actor

== See also ==
- Goulden
