= People's Republic of Zanzibar =

African state in the Indian Ocean (1964)

People's Republic of Zanzibar Jamhuri ya Watu wa Zanzibar (Swahili)
- 1964
- Flag
- Anthem: "Mungu ibariki Afrika" "God bless Africa"
- Capital: Zanzibar City
- Common languages: Swahili; Arabic; English
- Religion: Islam
- Government: Socialist republic
- President
  - 23 Jan – 26 Apr 1964: Abeid Karume
- Prime Minister
  - 12 January 1964 – 27 April 1964: Abdullah Kassim Hanga
- Historical era: Cold War
  - Zanzibar Revolution: 12 January 1964
  - Merger with Tanganyika: 26 April
  - Office of Prime Minister of Zanzibar abolished: 27 April 1964
- Currency: East African shilling
Preceded by	Succeeded by
Sultanate of Zanzibar	Zanzibar; Tanzania
- Today part of: Tanzania

The People's Republic of Zanzibar (Swahili: Jamhuri ya watu wa Zanzibar) was a short-lived African state founded in 1964, consisting of the islands of the Zanzibar Archipelago. It existed for less than six months before it merged with Tanganyika to create the "United Republic of Tanganyika and Zanzibar", which would be renamed the United Republic of Tanzania in November of that year.

== History ==
In the wake of the Zanzibar Revolution, a Revolutionary Council was established by the Afro-Shirazi Party and Umma party to act as an interim government, with Abeid Karume heading the council as President and Abdulrahman Mohammad Babu serving as the Minister of External Affairs. The country was renamed the People's Republic of Zanzibar; the new government's first acts were to permanently banish the Sultan and to ban the Zanzibar Nationalist Party and Zanzibar and Pemba People's Party. Seeking to distance himself from the volatile John Okello, Karume quietly sidelined him from the political scene, although he was allowed to retain his self-bestowed title of field marshal. However, Okello's revolutionaries soon began reprisals against the Arab and Asian population of Unguja, carrying out beatings, rapes, murders, and attacks on property. He claimed in radio speeches to have killed or imprisoned tens of thousands of his "enemies and stooges", but actual estimates of the number of deaths vary greatly, from "hundreds" to 20,000. Some Western newspapers give figures of 2,000–4,000; the higher numbers may be inflated by Okello's own broadcasts and exaggerated reports in some Western and Arab news media. The killing of Arab prisoners and their burial in mass graves was documented by an Italian film crew, filming from a helicopter, for Africa Addio and this sequence of film comprises the only known visual document of the killings. Many Arabs fled to safety in Oman, although by Okello's order no Europeans were harmed. The post-revolution violence did not spread to Pemba.

By 3 February, Zanzibar was finally returning to normality, and Karume had been widely accepted by the people as their president. A police presence was back on the streets, looted shops were re-opening, and unlicensed arms were being surrendered by the civilian populace. The revolutionary government announced that its political prisoners, numbering 500, would be tried by special courts. Okello formed the Freedom Military Force (FMF), a paramilitary unit made up of his own supporters, which patrolled the streets and looted Arab property. The behaviour of Okello's supporters, his violent rhetoric, Ugandan accent, and Christian beliefs were alienating many in the largely moderate Zanzibari and Muslim ASP, and by March many members of his FMF had been disarmed by Karume's supporters and the Umma Party militia. On 11 March Okello was stripped of his rank of Field Marshal, and was denied entry when trying to return to Zanzibar from a trip to the mainland. He was deported to Tanganyika and then to Kenya, before returning destitute to his native Uganda.

In April, the government formed the People's Liberation Army (PLA) and completed the disarmament of Okello's remaining FMF militia. On 26 April, Karume announced that a union had been negotiated with Tanganyika to form the new country of Tanzania. The merger was seen by contemporary media as a means of preventing communist subversion of Zanzibar; at least one historian states that it may have been an attempt by Karume, a moderate socialist, to limit the influence of the radically left-wing Umma Party. However, many of the Umma Party's socialist policies on health, education and social welfare were adopted by the government.

== Foreign reaction ==
British military forces in Kenya were made aware of the revolution at 4:45 am on 12 January, and following a request from the Sultan were put on 15 minutes' standby to conduct an assault on Zanzibar's airfield. However, the British High Commissioner in Zanzibar, Timothy Crosthwait, reported no instances of British nationals being attacked and advised against intervention. As a result, the British troops in Kenya were reduced to four hours' standby later that evening. Crosthwait decided not to approve an immediate evacuation of British citizens, as many held key government positions and their sudden removal would further disrupt the country's economy and government. To avoid possible bloodshed, the British agreed a timetable with Karume for an organised evacuation.

Within hours of the revolution, the American ambassador had authorised the withdrawal of US citizens on the island, and a US Navy destroyer, the USS Manley, arrived on 13 January. The Manley docked at Zanzibar Town harbour, but the US had not sought the Revolutionary Council's permission for the evacuation, and the ship was met by a group of armed men. Permission was eventually granted on 15 January, but the British considered this confrontation to be the cause of much subsequent ill-will against the Western powers in Zanzibar.

Western intelligence agencies believed that the revolution had been organised by communists supplied with weapons by the Warsaw Pact countries. This suspicion was strengthened by the appointment of Babu as Minister for External Affairs and Abdullah Kassim Hanga as Prime Minister, both known leftists with possible communist ties. Britain believed that these two were close associates of Oscar Kambona, the Foreign Affairs Minister of Tanganyika, and that former members of the Tanganyika Rifles had been made available to assist with the revolution. Some members of the Umma Party wore Cuban military fatigues and beards in the style of Fidel Castro, which was taken as an indication of Cuban support for the revolution. However, this practice was started by those members who had staffed a ZNP branch office in Cuba and it became a common means of dress amongst opposition party members in the months leading up to the revolution. The new Zanzibar government's recognition of the German Democratic Republic (the first African government to do so), and of North Korea, was further evidence to the Western Powers that Zanzibar was aligning itself closely with the communist bloc. Just six days after the revolution, The New York Times stated that Zanzibar was "on the verge of becoming the Cuba of Africa", but on 26 January denied that there was active communist involvement. Zanzibar continued to receive support from communist countries and by February was known to be receiving advisers from USSR, East Germany and China. At the same time, Western influence was diminishing and by July 1964 just one Briton, a dentist, remained in the employ of the Zanzibari government. It has been alleged that Israeli spymaster David Kimche was a backer of the revolution with Kimche in Zanzibar on the day of the Revolution.

The deposed Sultan made an unsuccessful appeal to Kenya and Tanganyika for military assistance, although Tanganyika sent 100 paramilitary police officers to Zanzibar to contain rioting. Other than the Tanganyika Rifles (formerly the colonial King's African Rifles), the police were the only armed force in Tanganyika, and on 20 January the police absence led the entire Rifles regiment to mutiny. Dissatisfied with their low pay rates and with the slow progress of the replacement of their British officers with Africans, the soldiers' mutiny sparked similar uprisings in both Uganda and Kenya. However, order on the African mainland was rapidly restored without serious incident by the British Army and Royal Marines.

The possible emergence of an African communist state remained a source of disquiet in the West. In February, the British Defence and Overseas Policy Committee said that, while British commercial interests in Zanzibar were "minute" and the revolution by itself was "not important", the possibility of intervention must be maintained. The committee was concerned that Zanzibar could become a centre for the promotion of communism in Africa, much like Cuba had in the Americas. Britain, most of the Commonwealth, and the United States withheld recognition of the new regime until 23 February, by which time it had already been recognised by much of the communist bloc. In Crosthwait's opinion, this contributed to Zanzibar aligning itself with the Soviet Union; Crosthwait and his staff were expelled from the country on 20 February and were only allowed to return once recognition had been agreed.

== Sources ==
- Daly, Samuel (2009), "Our Mother is Afro-Shirazi, Our Father is the Revolution" (PDF), Senior Thesis, New York: Columbia University.
- Lofchie, Michael F. (1967), "Was Okello's Revolution a Conspiracy?", Transition (33): 36–42, doi:10.2307/2934114, JSTOR 2934114.
- Parsons, Timothy (2003), The 1964 Army Mutinies and the Making of Modern East Africa, Greenwood Publishing Group, ISBN 0-325-07068-7.
- Plekhanov, Sergey (2004), A Reformer on the Throne: Sultan Qaboos Bin Said Al Said, Trident Press Ltd, ISBN 1-900724-70-7.
- Sheriff, Abdul; Ferguson, Ed (1991), Zanzibar Under Colonial Rule, James Currey Publishers, ISBN 0-85255-080-4.
- Speller, Ian (2007), "An African Cuba? Britain and the Zanzibar Revolution, 1964.", Journal of Imperial and Commonwealth History, 35 (2): 1–35, doi:10.1080/03086530701337666, S2CID 159656717.

== See also ==
- East Germany–Zanzibar relations
