= International Space Year =

1992 observance

The International Space Year (ISY) was 1992, the year of the quincentenary of Christopher Columbus's voyage to the Americas in 1492. First proposed by U.S. Senator Spark Matsunaga, the designation of 1992 as International Space Year was endorsed by 18 national and international space agencies, who also proposed the year's theme, "Mission to Planet Earth". Eventually, 29 national space agencies and 10 international organizations took part in coordinated activities to promote space exploration and the use of sustainable technology on Earth.

== United Nations endorsement ==
The United Nations Committee on the Peaceful Uses of Outer Space agreed to recognize the International Space Year to promote peaceful cooperation between nations during its 1990 session. United Nations Secretary-General Boutros Boutros-Ghali, addressing the World Space Congress in Washington, D.C., on August 28, 1992, said, "One of the central goals of International Space year is to highlight the importance of understanding the Earth as a single, complex, interdependent system and to stress the unique role that space science and technology can play in promoting that understanding." Given that the year 1992 marked the anniversary of 500 years of genocide around the world, the UN Working Group on Indigenous Populations requested the United Nations recognize 1992 as the International Year of the World's Indigenous People. However, the colonial nations of the Americas and Spain blocked the request as they had plans to celebrate the Quincentenary of Columbus' voyage. The United States featured a poster celebrating 1992 as the International Space Year in which, as described by the Smithsonian National Air and Space Museum: "Movie character 'ET' embraces earth; on horizon shows progression of exploring vehicles from [C]olumbus' ships to present." It celebrates Columbus' voyage, indicating the Columbian legacy was viewed as an inspiration for the future of space travel.

== Global activities ==
International Space Year was celebrated by 29 space agencies in various countries with the purpose of establishing peaceful international relations in space programs. International Space Year conferences were held regularly in many nations.

=== Australia ===
In Australia, many public events were organized to augment public awareness of space by the National Space Society chapters of Australia. CSIRO led the "Mission to Planet Earth" Land Cover Change project, using satellites to study plant life on Earth in relation to climate and civilization. CSIRO and various Australian Universities also studied the ocean using European and Japanese satellites. Additionally, a series of commemorative stamps was issued by the Australia Post for International Space Year.

=== Japan ===
In Tokyo, Japan, a conference—the Asia-Pacific International Space Year Conference—was held to discuss the "Mission to Planet Earth" theme and international cooperation.

=== Russia ===
In Russia, the Foundation for Social Inventions launched Space Flight Europe-America 500 in an attempt to promote a peaceful social and economic relationship between the former Soviet states and the United States of America. Space Flight Europe-America 500 consisted of a Proton rocket carrying various items symbolizing peace, which orbited the Earth for a few days. The space craft was scheduled to land near Washington in late November. Its cost was estimated by Russian authorities at over US$200 million.

=== United States ===
In the United States, NASA, which led the US space agencies, responded to ISY with the completion or creation of many important space programs, including numerous collaborations with other domestic and international space agencies. A total of twelve programmes were launched, the most in any year up to that point. NASA focused particularly on projects — such as the Mars Observer, which studied the atmosphere and climate of Mars — that examined the possibility of sustaining human life outside Earth, as well as those exploring problems that existed on Earth at the time. ISY was also recognized with the opening of a new exhibit, entitled "Where Next, Columbus?" at the National Air and Space Museum.

==== They Might Be Giants ====
ISY logo used for Apollo 18

American alternative rock band They Might Be Giants were designated by NASA as the "Musical Ambassador" of the International Space Year when they were searching the NASA archives for images for their album, Apollo 18. The title of the album came directly from the NASA Apollo program, the last mission of which was Apollo 17. Accordionist and singer-songwriter John Linnell jokingly speculated that an album named Apollo 18 would be a cheaper alternative to actually manning a flight to the Moon as part of the International Space Year, although the album title was selected prior to the band's involvement with ISY. In support of the celebration, the album's back cover artwork and some promotional materials feature the International Space Year logo. Linnell explained that "[the band is] supposed to be included on lists of events happening in connection with International Space Year...In other words, on a particular month they'll say in some town there's this lecture about space telescopes and then there's this They Might Be Giants concert." On a different occasion, however, he pointed out that he "[didn't] think most people have heard that this is International Space Year".

== See also ==
- Space Flight Europe-America 500
