= Peter Golden =

Peter Golden may refer to:

- Peter Allen Golden (born 1953), American author
- Peter Benjamin Golden (born 1941), American historian
