= Yelena Khanga =

Russian journalist and writer

- Елена Ханга
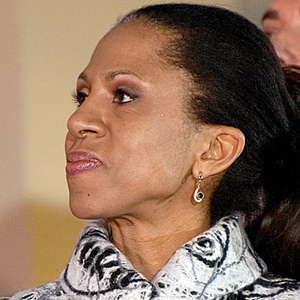
- Khanga in 2010
- Born: Yelena Abdulaevna Khanga; 1 May 1962 (age 64); Moscow, Russian SFSR, USSR
- Other name: Elena Hanga
- Citizenship: Russia; United States
- Education: Moscow State University
- Occupations: Journalist; television personality; writer
- Years active: 1985–present
- Spouse: Igor Mintusov (m. 2002)
- Children: 1
- Parents: Abdullah Kassim Hanga (father); Lily Golden (mother)

Yelena Abdulayevna Khanga (Russian: Елена Абдулаевна Ханга; born 1 May 1962), also known as Elena Hanga, is a Russian journalist, television personality, and writer, who is best known for hosting the Russian television programs Pro eto (1997–2000) and Printsip domino (2001–2006) on NTV.

== Early life ==
Khanga was born in Moscow to parents Abdullah Kassim Hanga (1932–1969) and Lily Golden (1934–2010). Her father was a Zanzibari politician who served as prime minister of Zanzibar in 1964, and was later executed without trial in 1969 for an alleged plot to overthrow the regime of Abeid Karume. Her mother was born in Tashkent to American parents Oliver Golden (1892–1940) and Bertha Bialek (1905–1985). Golden was an African-American from Mississippi and graduate of the Tuskegee Institute, while Bialek was a white woman from New York City of Polish-Jewish descent. They immigrated together to the Soviet Union in 1931, as interracial marriage was outlawed in much of the United States at the time and socially unaccepted, settling in Tashkent where they became specialists in the Uzbek cotton industry.

Khanga's mother was an academic and alumna of Moscow State University in Africana studies, who later worked at the Institute of African Studies of the Soviet Academy of Sciences and taught at the University of Chicago. Growing up, Khanga was a youth tennis player coached by Russian former professional tennis player Anna Dmitrieva, and later graduated from Moscow State University in 1984, with a degree in journalism.

== Career ==
After graduating with her degree in 1984, Khanga began her career as a journalist with The Moscow News, the English language newspaper of the Soviet Union. She additionally appeared as a contestant on the Soviet television game show KVN in the 1980s. In 1987, Khanga became the first Russian journalist to participate in a foreign-exchange program with the American news organization The Christian Science Monitor in Boston. After returning to the Soviet Union the following year, she began appearing on the television program Vzglyad. While residing in New York City in the early 1990s, Khanga published the book Soul to Soul: The Story of a Black Russian American Family: 1865–1992 with Susan Jacoby in 1994, which chronicled her family history and life as a black Russian-Jewish woman.

In 1996, Khanga joined the Russian television channel NTV as a sports reporter. The following year, she became the host of the NTV television talk show Pro eto, which became the first talk show in Russia which focused on sexual subject matter and other societal taboos. The show aired from 1997 to 2000, and covered such controversial topics as HIV/AIDS, homosexuality, and sexual harassment. In a 2010 interview with The New York Times, Khanga stated that the reception to the show's first airing in Russia was "like a bomb went off". In April 2001, Khanga temporarily left NTV, and produced the program Bolshoy Babilon for NTV International in New York, before returning to NTV in Moscow later that year in November.

In December 2001, Khanga became a cohost on the daytime talk show Printsip domino on NTV. Beginning in 2004, she began to serve as both cohost and director of the program, replacing former director Ivan Usachyov. She later departed from the show in May 2006. In a November 2018 interview, Khanga stated that she remained affiliated with NTV until October 2018, but had been officially on leave from the network and had worked on no television programs since 2006, due to the absence of new programs being produced and difficult relations between herself and the network's then-director general Vladimir Kulistikov.

In 2009, Khanga began working for the network Russia Today, appearing in English language content. She initially hosted the weekly show CrossTalk, and later cohosted the program Reference Point with Aleksandr Gurnov from 2013 to 2015. From 2010 to 2016, she hosted radio programs on the radio station of Komsomolskaya Pravda, and from 2011 to 2014, hosted the television program S pultom po zhizni on KP-TV, the television station of Komsomolskaya Pravda. From 2019 to 2020, Khanga hosted the television program Svoya pravda on ETV+, the Estonian television broadcaster for the Russian-Estonian community. Since 2020, she has hosted her own program KHANGost on her YouTube channel.

== Personal life ==
Khanga is a dual citizen of Russia and the United States, having received United States citizenship through her American maternal grandparents. In addition to living most of her life in Moscow, Khanga has also previously lived and worked in Boston and New York City.

Khanga has been married to Russian political consultant and campaign advisor Igor Mintusov since 2002, and they have one daughter together. The family primarily resides in Moscow, while they also own a home in New York City. Khanga is additionally the aunt of Hungarian professional basketball player Ádám Hanga.
