= Samara state academy for gifted children =

State budgetary academy of the Samara State

Samara state academy for gifted children (Nayanova)
- Академия для одарённых детей (Наяновой)
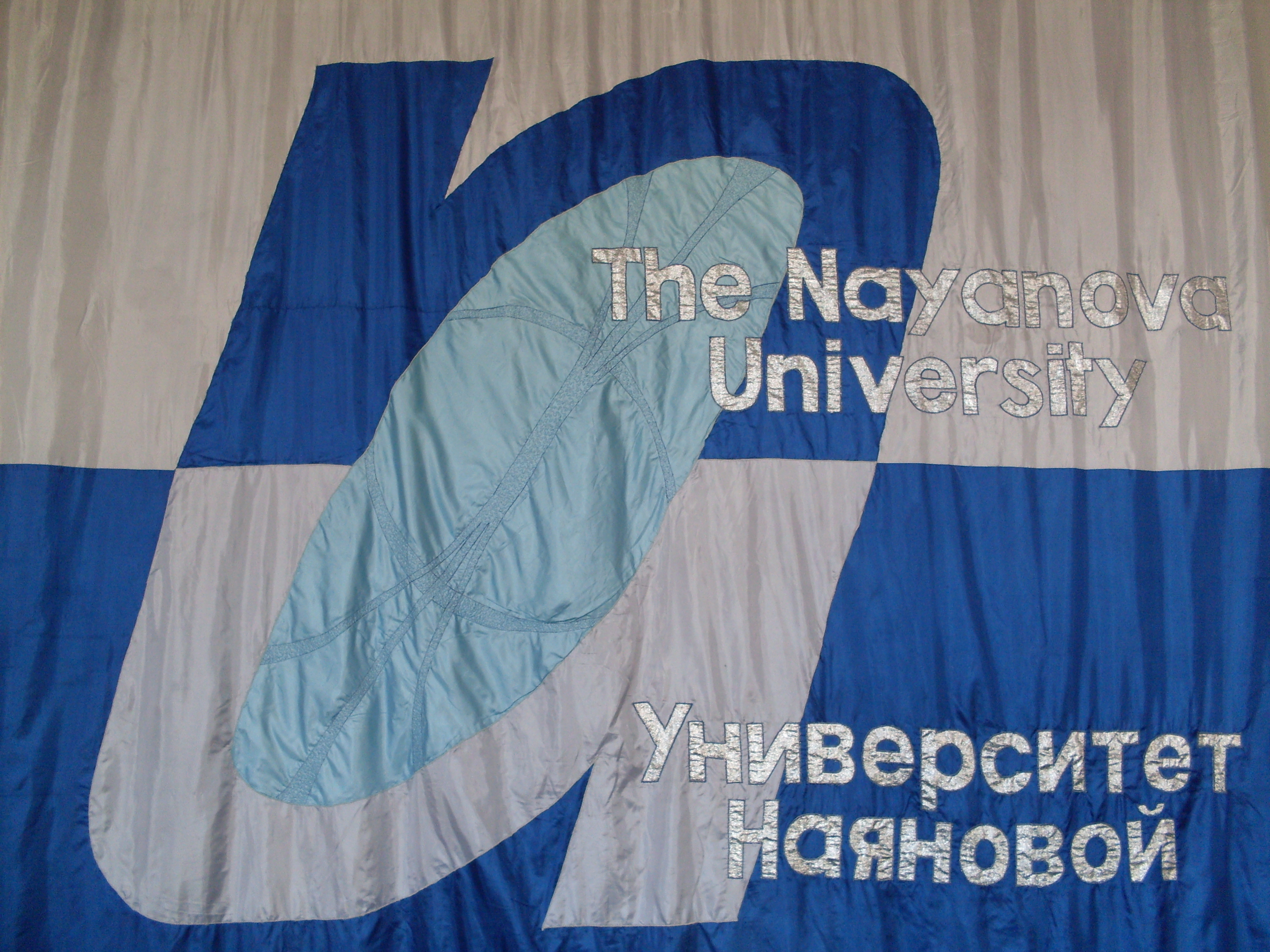
- Coat of arms of the Samara state academy for gifted children (Nayanova)
- Former names: Nayanova University
- Type: Public
- Established: 1988
- Rector: Marina Nayanova
- Location: Samara, Russia; 53°12′03″N 50°06′21″E
- Language: Russian
- Colours: Blue & White
- Website: nayanova.edu
- Главное здание
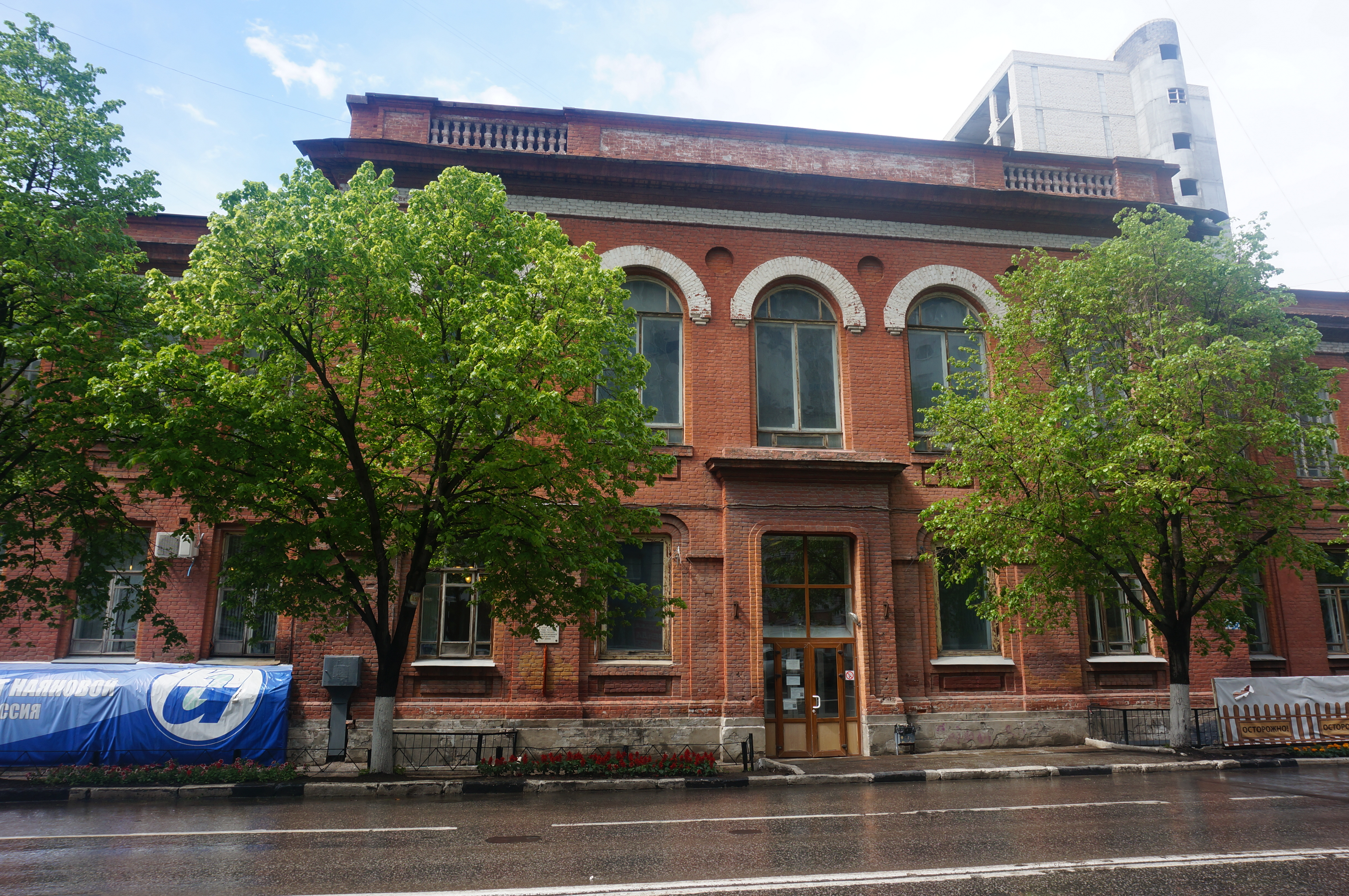

General information
- Location: Samara, Russia

Technical details
- Floor count: 3

Samara state academy for gifted children (Nayanova) previously known as Nayanova University, is a primary and secondary school in Samara, Russia. It was founded in 1988. The permanent rector of the school, from the date of its foundation, is Nayanova Marina Venediktovna. Its address is Molodogvargejskaja Street 196.

The school is organized in 4 stages:

1. preschool: for children aged 4 to 6 years inclusive. At this stage, the primary skills of the general educational culture are formed: reading, counting, designing; self-control, self-assessment; academic collaboration.
2. primary school (grades 1–4): At this stage, the student discovers the world of science and culture in an entertaining form, becomes acquainted with the main subjects that will be studied in the future (with three European languages, physics, computer science, the “Bible in the context of world artistic culture”)
3. middle school (grades 5–7): During this period, students not only acquire basic knowledge in the disciplines of the humanitarian and natural sciences cycle but also acquire the first research skills under the guidance of teachers. An essential educational component of this period is learning three modern European languages.
4. high school (grades 8–11): At this stage, students after comprehensive vocational guidance and psychological-pedagogical testing in accordance with their interests, inclinations and socio-cultural attitudes are trained in one of the chosen areas: humanitarian, economic, physical and mathematical, chemical and biological. During this period of study, students are actively involved in research activities.

All programs follow state educational standards. The school is licensed by the Federal Service for Supervision in Education and Science.

== History ==
SSOAN was founded in 1988 as Laboratory of Psychological and Pedagogical Research at Kuibyshev State Pedagogical Institute. On May 15, 1989, converted to Basic School-Laboratory of Kuibyshev State Pedagogical Institute. On February 14, 1990, transformed in College of Kuibyshev Scientific Center of the USSR Academy of Sciences.

In 1992 college students participate in forming items for Space Flight Europe-America 500 goodwill mission.

On July 13, 1993, transformed in Samara Municipal Complex of Continuing Education Nayanova University. At the same time Higher education stage was opened.

In 1998 according to journal Career university placed #12 in a list of "One hundred best universities of Russia".

In 2003 university team share 21st place at World Finals of The International Collegiate Programming Contest.

On November 7, 2008, by returning in the regional education system was renamed as Samara State Oblast University (Nayanova). In 2010 change status and renamed as Samara State Oblast Academy (Nayanova).

In 2013 Moscow Center for Continuous Mathematical Education and the Ministry of Education and Science of the Russian Federation included academy's faculty of General Education (primary, secondary school & early specialization stage) in TOP-500 Russia Schools.

In October 2018 the academy lost its accreditation for all programs of higher education and students were given a choice to continue their education in other state universities. Most students chose Samara State Technical University and Samara National Research University. In February 2019, the regional minister of education supports a transformation into a non-standard educational institution for gifted children.

== International cooperation ==
Academy participates in volunteer exchange program – International cultural youth exchange.

Academy is part of language network of partner universities of France embassy.

Academy participates in the program of bilingual schools under the aegis of French Ministry of National Education and Department of Foreign Affairs and International Development of France.

Since 2011 Academy is part of network of associated UNESCO schools.

Academy is certified partner of Goethe-Institut with program PASCH-SCHULEN: Partner der Zukunft.

== Publications ==
Since very beginning academy publishes journal started as "College", latter named "University circular".

Since 2000 academy publishes a newspaper for students learning French. A newspaper is recommended by Department of Culture of the French Embassy in Russia.

Since 2005 academy every year publishes a collection of best theses by students and teachers alike made on annual scientific and practical conference "Science. Oeuvre." in early April.

== Higher education & postgraduate studies ==
From 1993 till December 2018 academy provided training in higher education & postgraduate programs.

- Faculty of mathematics and computer sciences (А) opened in 1993 with specialty "The applied mathematics and computer science" and profile "System programming and computer technology" and postgraduate studies program "Computer Science and Engineering".
- Philosophical faculty (Б) opened in 1993 with specialty "Philosophy" and profile "Theoretical & methodological" and postgraduate studies program "Philosophy, ethics, and religious studies".
- Chemical and biological faculty (В) opened in 1993 with specialty "Biology" and profile "Bioecology" and postgraduate studies program "Biological Sciences".
- Economical faculty (Г) opened in 1993 with specialty "Economy" and profiles "Accounting, analysis, and audit in the commercial organizations" & "Financial control and state audit" and postgraduate studies program "Economy".
- Faculty of law (Д) opened in 1993 with specialty "Jurisprudence" and profiles "Common" & "Civil law" and postgraduate studies program "Jurisprudence".
- Faculty of foreign affairs (Е) opened in 2005 with specialty "Public relations" and profile "Public relations in commercial enterprises".
- Tech-Management Faculty (У) opened in 2005 with specialty "Quality control" and profiles "Quality control in an orb of housekeeping and services" & "Quality control in information technologies".
- Theatrical faculty (И) opened in 2008 with specialty "Actor's art" and profile "Artist of drama theatre and cinema".
- Tourism faculty (Т) opened in 2011 with speciality "Tourism" and profile "Technology and organization of operator and agency services".

== Critique ==
In 2008, during the transition from municipal to regional subordination, it turned out that the university has no acts confirming the ownership of the buildings. At the beginning of December, according to Vremya, about 30 such documents were missing. According to Yefim Kogan, an expert from the National Training Foundation: “The situation is due to the fact that all the formalities of the transfer of a university from one subordination to another must be observed. Lack of funding means that there is no corresponding document. -or steps, whether the resolution of financial issues or property issues. Financing can begin only when there is a decree of the regional government, but it is not there yet. Of course, to avoid such Roble, all of these issues should have been dealt with in advance."

In 2017, the academy encountered difficulties in accepting applications for the recruitment of children in the first classes. A week before the announced start date of the children's enrollment (December 16), a live queue of parents began to form at the doorstep of the school. To the surprise and indignation of parents, a short announcement of this content appeared on the academy website at 23.00 on Thursday: “Due to written requests from a large number of parents of future first-graders about the unhealthy situation caused by the actions of a group of people around the admission, the management of SGOAN made a decision on the postponement of receiving applications from 12/16/2016 on a different date. The decision regarding the new date will be announced later.”

== School buildings ==
=== First building ===
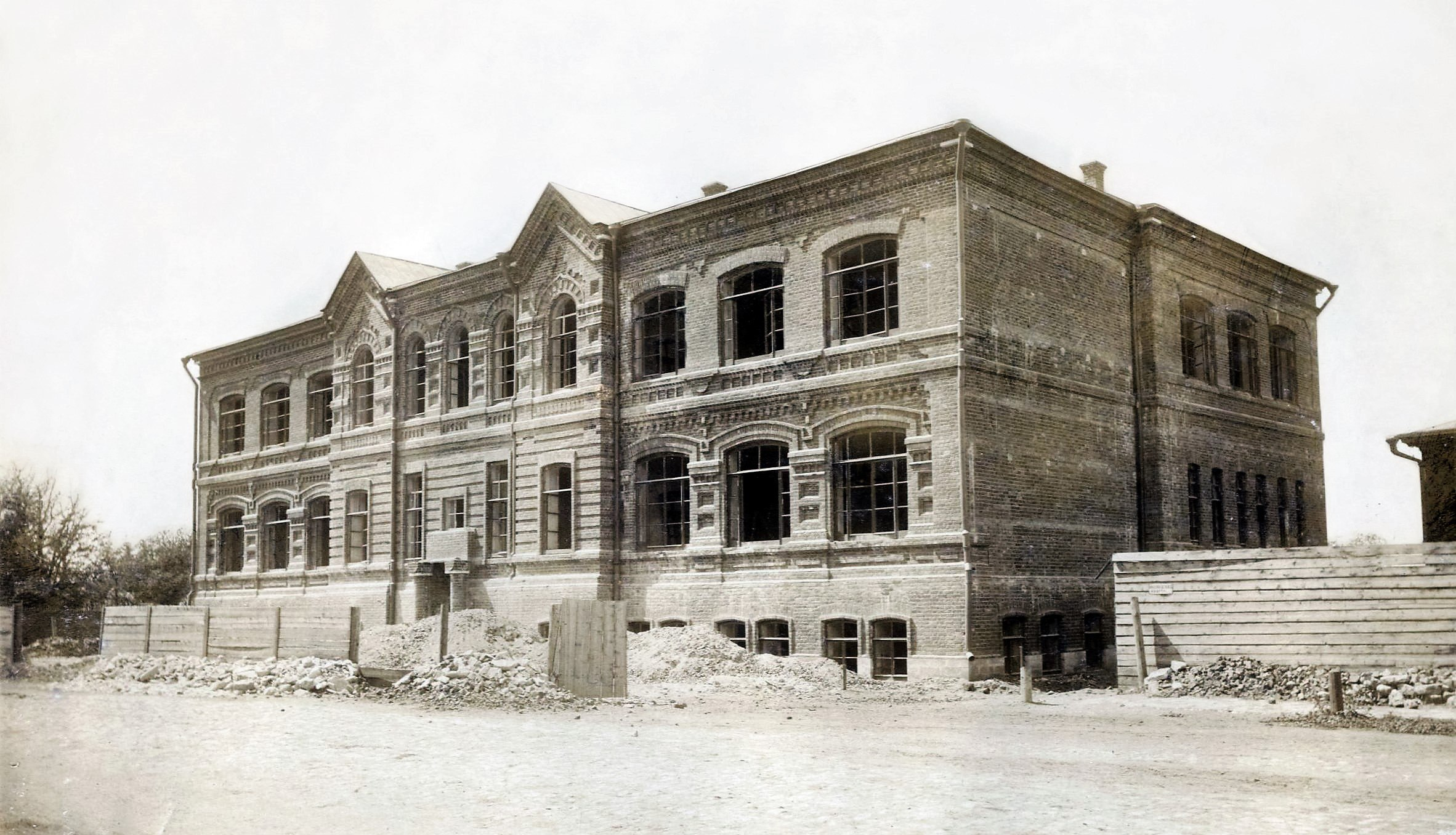
Samara city secondary school 1895

Location: Chapaevskaja Street 186, Samara

From 1919 till 1921 building was occupied by the branch of Vkhutemas.

Most of the Soviet time building belonged to the Kuibyshev Institute of Culture.

In the Soviet Union in 1987 by the executive committee of the Kuibyshev Regional Council of People's Deputies and in Russia in 2014 by the order of the Ministry of Culture of the Samara region building was marked as an object of cultural heritage of regional significance.

=== Second Building ===
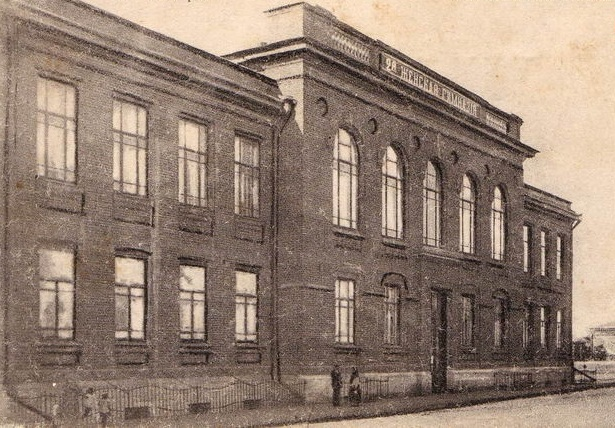
Second female gymnasium (Samara) 1912

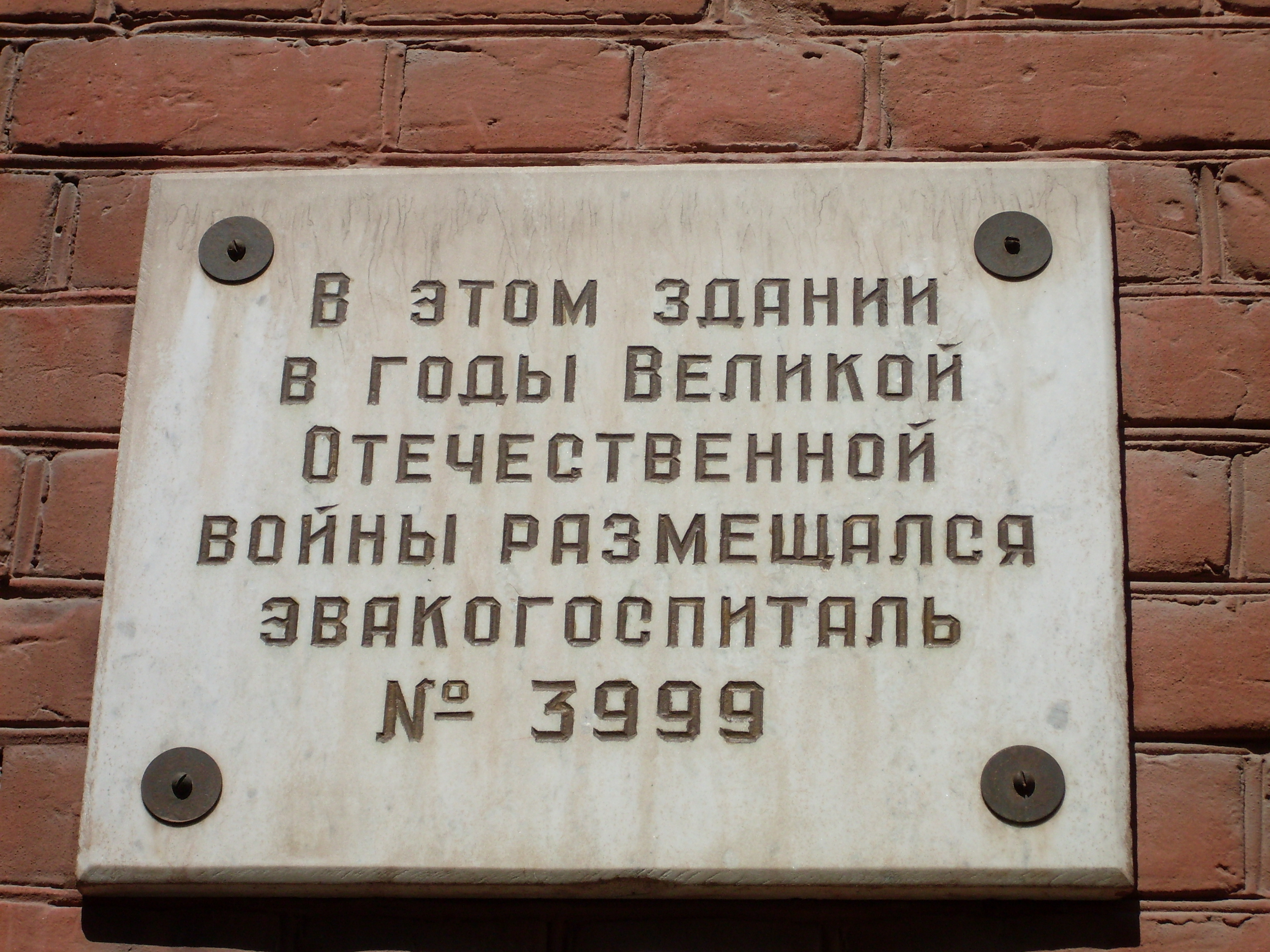
Memorial tablet

Location: Molodogvardejskaya Street 196, Samara

At the time of World War I building contained the 96th General Emergency Hospital.

As the Eastern Front of World War II unfolded, the building was put in the disposal of a special group of the NKVD in connection with the impending transfer of the capital of the USSR from Moscow to Kuibyshev.

From February 1, 1943, till October 1, 1945, building hosts hospital for evacuees #3999 with trauma surgical and prosthetic and orthopedic profile. One of the patients was a prototype-hero of The story of a real man – Alexey Maresyev.

From 1945 till 1993 Kuibyshev Regional Hospital for the Disabled of the Great Patriotic War was located in the building.

In 1993 building was transferred to the Nayanova University.

It is on located the side of street Molodogvardejsky closer to the Volga between Ulyanovskaja St. and a student's lane, between Samara state architectural university and the House of the scientists.

=== Third Building ===
Location: Molodogvardejskaya Street 135, Samara

It is on the side of Molodogvardejskaja St. long-distance from the Volga, on the intersection with Ulyanovskaja St. The university occupies a part of the ground floor of a building which is predominantly a block of flats. Earlier having lecture rooms, this housing has now exclusively administrative value. Here the personnel department, office, and accounting service place. At the end of July 2009, all employees were transferred to Molodogvardejskaya St., 196 building. In February 2010 university was given a new building located at Yarmarochnaya St., 17.

Information about the building is given according to the state historical and cultural expertise.

The estate in the 3rd part of the city of Samara in the 113th quarter at the Voskresenskaya square, according to the fortress bill of sale of April 15, 1864, belonged to a hereditary honorary citizen of Samara, merchant Old Believer Ivan Lvovich Sanin. From the entire complex of buildings planned and approved by the Building Department of the Samara Provincial Government on May 4, 1864, only a wooden house (outbuilding) was erected at the corner of Samara St. and Voskresenskja Square.

After the death of I.L.Sanin on September 8, 1910, the estate was inherited by his wife Maria Kondratyevna Sanina (née. Podrueva) (1834–1917).

February 13, 1912 M.K.Sanina and the representative from the Samara community of Old Believers who recognized the priesthood of the Belokrinitsky hierarchy Penzin in the house of a notary Yurin made an act of donation, established by her late husband hereditary honorary citizen Ivan Lvovich Saniyyam on January 7, 1907, a free canteen in Samara named after Old Believers Ivan and Maria Sani and currently functioning under the charter approved on March 15, 1911, of the real estate belonging to her, inherited from the deceased.

In the Soviet period, buildings on the former estate of Sanin were nationalized. They did not undergo significant external restructuring. However, a change in their functional use led to the significant redevelopment of the internal space. So, for example, with the placement in the former trading building of a garment factory, the existing partitions between the shops were eliminated, a single production room was formed inside the building. The territory of the factory was separated from residential buildings on the Samarskaja St., 201 by a wooden fence and the estate of the Sanins as a single complex of buildings has ceased to exist.
