= Goulden =

Goulden is a surname. Notable people with the surname include:

- Cyril Goulden (1897–1981), Welsh/Canadian geneticist, statistician, and agronomist
- Dennis Goulden, Canadian film producer and documentarian
- Eric Goulden, birth name of Wreckless Eric (born 1954), English singer-songwriter
- Ian Goulden, British and Canadian mathematician
- John Goulden (born 1941), British civil servant
- Joseph A. Goulden (1844–1915), American educator, businessman, veteran and politician
- Joseph C. Goulden (born 1934), American writer
- Len Goulden (1912–1995), English footballer
- Richard Reginald Goulden (1876–1932), British sculptor

== See also ==
- Goolden
- Gaulden
