= Lily Golden =

Soviet and Russian historian and activist (1934–2010)

- Лия Голден
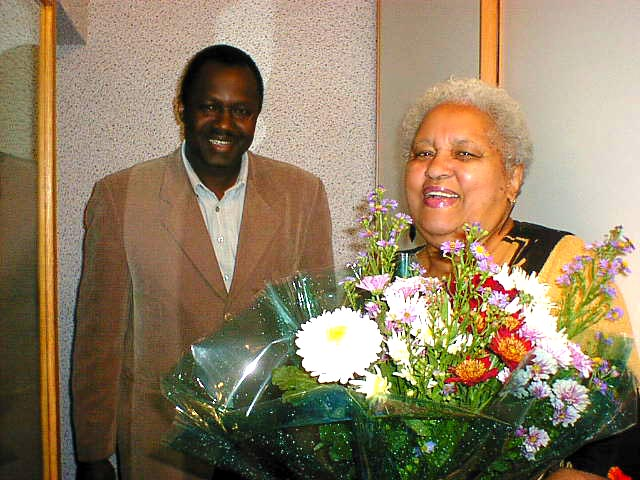
- Golden in 2005
- Born: Liya Oliverovna Golden; 18 July 1934; Tashkent, Uzbek SSR, Soviet Union
- Died: 6 December 2010 (aged 76)
- Occupations: Historian; civil rights activist; writer
- Spouses: Abdullah Kassim Hanga (m. 1960; died 1968): Boris Yagovlev
- Children: Elena Khanga
- Father: Oliver Golden

Academic background
- Education: State Conservatory of Uzbekistan; Moscow State University

Academic work
- Discipline: Black studies
- Institutions: Institute of Oriental Studies of the Russian Academy of Sciences; Institute for African Studies; Chicago State University

Liya Oliverovna Golden (Russian: Лия Оливеровна Голден; 18 July 1934 – 6 December 2010) was a Soviet and Russian historian and civil rights advocate. A national tennis player and pianist during her youth, she worked at the Institute for African Studies and did research on Black studies. After moving to the United States after Mikhail Gorbachev's glasnost and perestroika reforms, she became a scholar-in-residence at Chicago State University and an advocate for racial equality.

== Biography ==
Liya Oliverovna Golden was born on 18 July 1934, in Tashkent, Uzbek SSR. Her father Oliver Golden was an African-American agronomist from the Southern United States, and her mother Bertha (née Bialek) was a Polish Jew from New York. The couple had moved to the Soviet Union to pursue an interracial marriage. After being unable to return to their native United States alongside her mother due to anti-Black racism and World War II, Golden remained in the Uzbek SSR, where she played tennis for the national team. She was educated at the State Conservatory of Uzbekistan, winning a music competition at one point. Following the encouragement of actor Wayland Rudd, she went to Moscow State University, where she majored in African-American history and became their first Black student.

Golden began working at the African studies department of the Institute of Oriental Studies of the Russian Academy of Sciences, before becoming part of the newly-inaugurated Institute for African Studies in 1958 and eventually serving as acting director. Although her academic research was ideologically controlled, she did some research on "officially disapproved" genres of contemporary Black music, as well as on Abkhazians of African descent. In addition to her work on African music and the African diaspora of the Soviet Union, she worked on three Soviet documentaries about the First World Festival of Negro Arts in 1966 with camera operator Georgy Serov, and released an autobiography, My Long Journey Home (2002).

In 1960, she married Prime Minister of Zanzibar Abdullah Kassim Hanga, whom she had met during the 6th World Festival of Youth and Students in 1957; they had a daughter, journalist Yelena Khanga, and the couple remained married until Hanga's execution in 1968. She later married Boris Yagovlev, a Vladimir Lenin expert.

In 1987, amidst Mikhail Gorbachev's glasnost and perestroika reforms, Golden visited the United States to find relatives at the invitation of Center for Citizen Initiatives founder Sharon Tennison. She moved to the country the next year, and she also had her birthright to United States citizenship upheld as the daughter of American parents. After her daughter's appearance on the television program 20/20 led to a relative in Chicago connecting with her, she reunited with more than a hundred of her father's relatives there in 1989. She began working at Chicago State University in 1992, becoming a distinguished scholar-in-residence there, as well as a translator of books on Russian history. On 26 September 1992, she met both sides of her family in the United States for the first time as part of a reunion.

Inspired by her multiethnic heritage, she became an advocate for racial equality while living in the United States, and she was known to be a "tower of strength, hope and source of inspiration" for Afro-Russians, especially with the rise of racism after the collapse of the Soviet Union, and for her advancements in Russia's relations with Africa. She also was a United Nations representative for such NGOs as the Center for Citizen Initiatives and founded the Golden Foundation of Russian-African Culture.

Golden died on 6 December 2010 following a "long and serious illness". In 2024, Kester Kenn Klomegah said that Golden "has a special place in history of the relations between Russia and Africa" and that her works are "still considered as foundations to multifaceted relations from the Soviet times until today".
