= Communism in Africa =

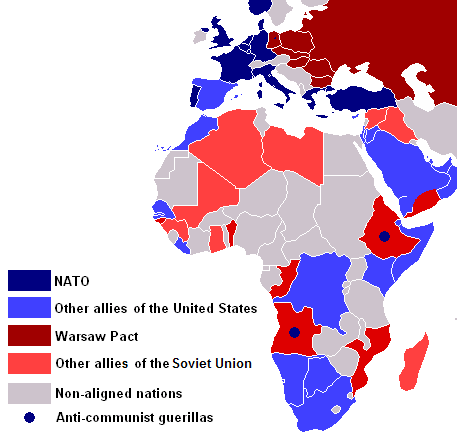
A map showing all communist countries (red) and the countries in the allies (blue) in Africa during the Cold War.

Communism in Africa spans from the early years in the 1920s to the peak of the Cold War and to the present day. With various political parties involving Communism, and political figures in favour of Communist reforms.

== Origins: 1920-1950s ==
The spread of Communism in Africa dates back to the early 1920s, when the South African Communist Party (SACP) was formed in South Africa. It gained major traction, and wanted to unite the quality of black and white workers. It failed however, and in the 1950s it was banned. In 1928, the International Trade Union Committee of Negro Workers (ITUCNW) was formed for black workers in Africa. It was later banned in Europe.

The SACP (emblem pictured) marked the beginning of Communist spread in Africa.

Many leaders in the African National Congress focused on labour issues primarily in the Western Cape province during the 1930s. Also during this time, countries in West Africa experienced major movements for Communist rule within the nation. From World War II, it was considered illegal to be in a communist party or participate in any anti-colonial movement.

According to the State Archive of the Russian Federation, during the independence of various countries under the Decolonisation of Africa, they were backed up by either the Soviet Union (USSR) or China in the 1950s.

The SACP was re-established in 1953. In 1961, Chris Hani, a prominent revolutionary member, rose to power and became the leader of the SACP. He was then assassinated in April 1993.

== Cold war (1955-1991) ==
The USSR became more interested in the spread of Communism in Africa during the early years of the Cold War. In January 1955, the Soviet Economic Policy received reforms in Africa. It was reformed following the Sino-Soviet split. Overtime, concern grew regarding Soviet influence in Africa by the Truman and Eisenhower Administrations.

During the Cold War in the 1960s, the USSR also became involved in several Marxist activities in Southern Africa, more specifically Angola's independence, which would lead to its war of independence in 1961. According to historian Edward George, an estimated 450,000 Cubans served in the war in Angola between 1975 and 1991.

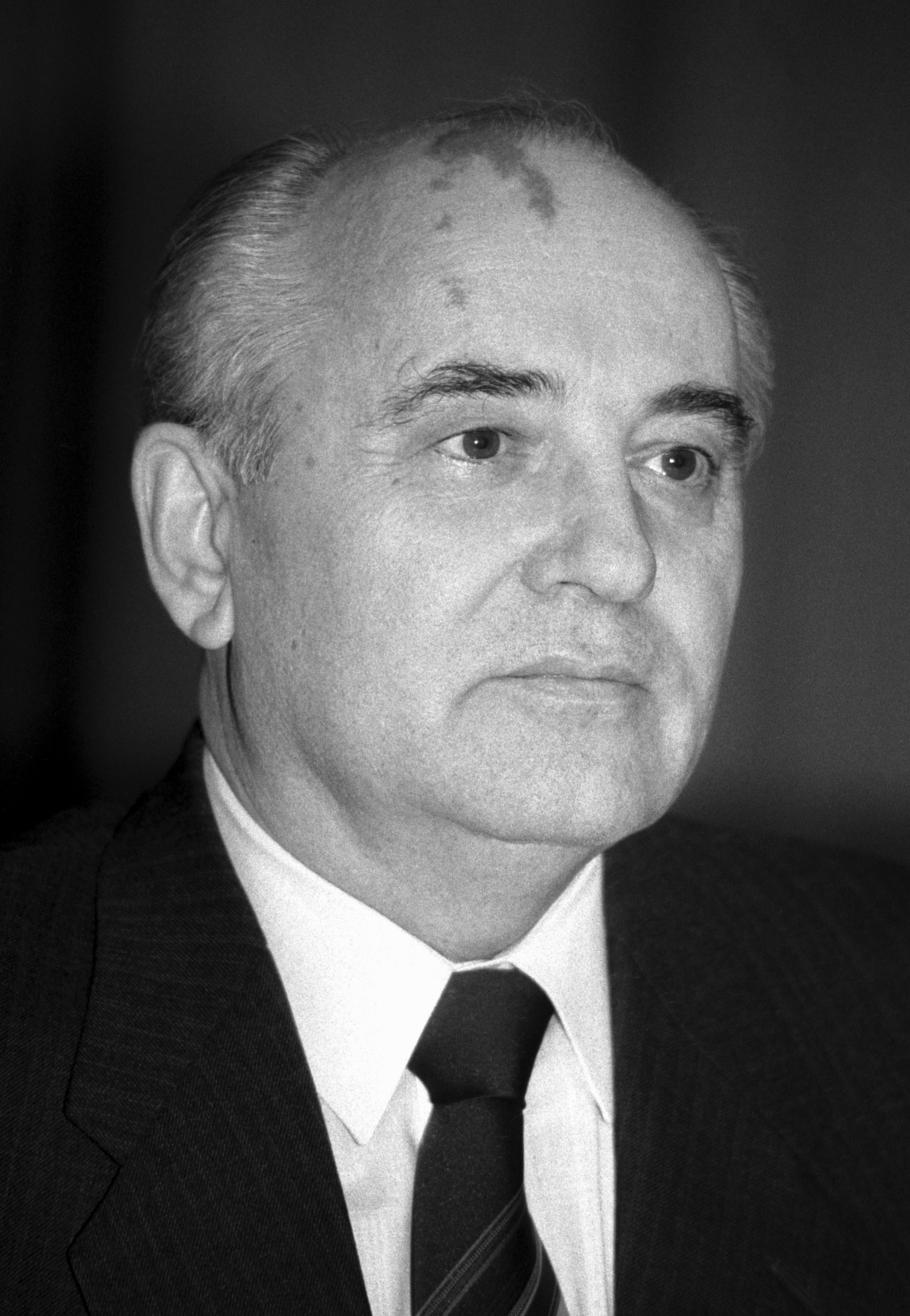
Mikhail Gorbachev (pictured) was a major figure in the spread of Communism in Africa.

=== Soviet military presence in Africa (1960-1990) ===
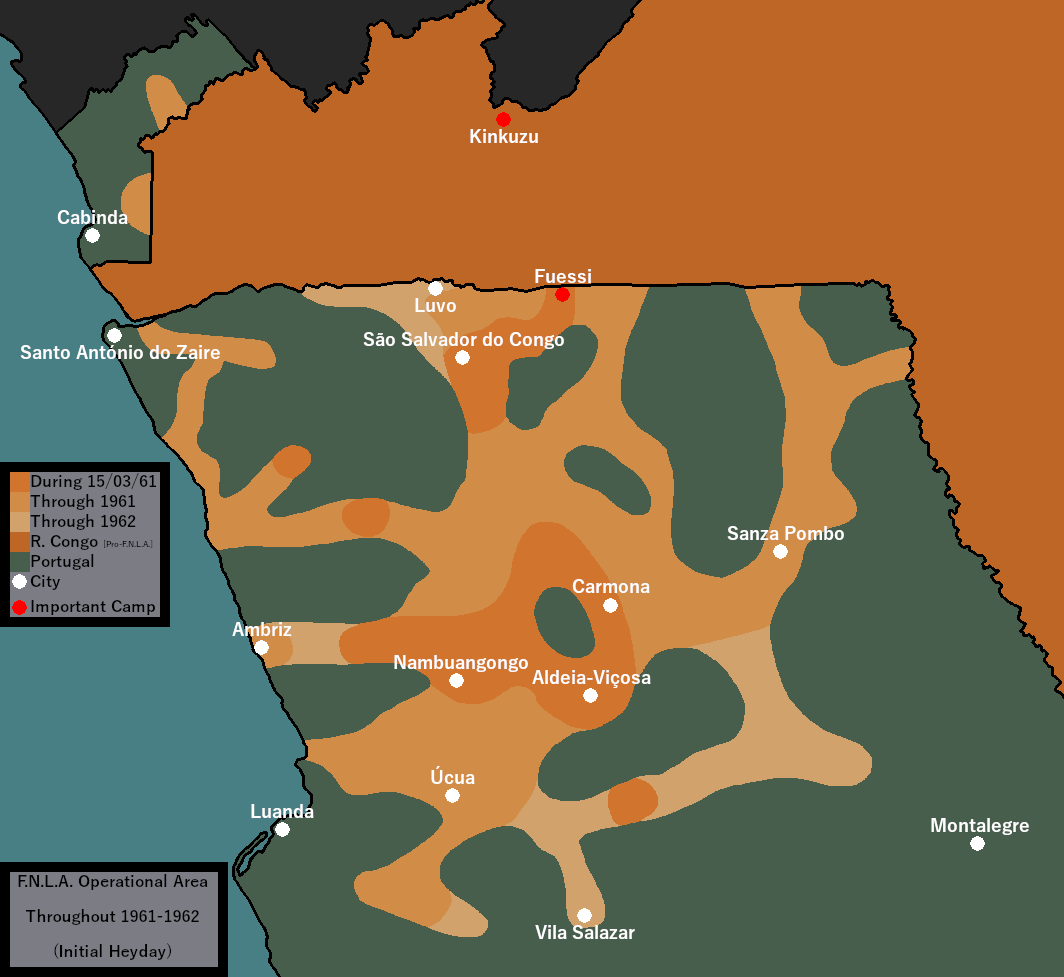
Map of the National Liberation Front of Angola operational area from 1961 to 1962 (in orange).

During the Congo crisis between 1960 and 1962, the USSR supported the Free Republic of the Congo, and later the Kwilu and Simba rebels. The USSR places troops throughout the Western parts of Africa. In October 1979, American secretary and diplomat David D. Newsom reported an estimated 41,000 Soviet troops in the Sub-Saharan region.

By December 1984, the USSR established a military presence of about 4,900 men in the region and in certain countries in West Africa such as Guinea and Mozambique. During this time, American efforts to intervene were halted by the United States Congress.

Mikhail Gorbachev also became heavily interested in developing Western African countries. He helped out the People’s Liberation Army of Namibia during the South African Border War. Beginning in 1985, the USSR began withdrawing its personal and military advisers from Africa, primarily Southern Africa. And by 1990, the Tripartite Accord was signed, granting South Africa and Namibia independence.

=== Collapse of the USSR (1991) ===
After the dissolution of the Soviet Union in December 1991, many countries that were backed up by the USSR started to decline in the Marxist ideology. As a result, various countries began their change in ideology. Sousa Jamba from the Angolan newspaper Semanario Angolense described the change as abrupt. Mengistu Haile Mariam, former leader and military dictator of Derg, fled Ethiopia in May 1991 to Zimbabwe due to uncivil rest in the country as a result of the collapse.

== Legacy ==
=== Architecture ===
The Tiglachin Monument (pictured) in 2021, is one of the buildings inspired by Communism.

There are various architectures that are inspired by Communist designs. The Tiglachin Monument in Addis Ababa is an example of such architecture. It was donated from North Korean advisers. Another example would be the Red Star Square in Cotonou, Benin. It was built after Mathieu Kérékou under his leadership.

== See also ==
- African socialism
- Africa–Soviet Union relations
- Communist propaganda

== Sources ==
- Brayton, Abbott A. (1979). "Soviet Involvement in Africa". Cambridge University Press. 17 (2): 253–269. ISSN 0022-278X – via JSTOR.
- Filatova, Irina (2017-02-27), "Communism in South Africa", in Spear, Thomas (ed.), Oxford Research Encyclopedia of African History, Oxford University Press, ISBN 978-0-19-785172-2
- Gaddis, John Lewis (2005). The Communist Challenge to Africa. Penguin Press.
- Hakim, Adi (1997). "Symposium: Around the Empire". Science & Society. 61 (1): 94.
- Limb, Peter (2010). "12". Moderate Centre, Militant Province? The Cape in the 1930s. University of South Africa. pp. 415–444.
- Newsom, David D. (1979-10-18). Communism in Africa. Department of State, Bureau of Public Affairs.
- Richmond, Ian Greig (1977). The Communist Challenge to Africa. Foreign Affairs Publishing Company.
- Shapovalova, Anna (2023-07-25). "Communism and Africa: From Colonialism to Decolonization through Russian Sources". Storicamente (in Italian). 18. ISSN 2282-6033. Archived from the original on 2026-05-09.
- Zack-Williams, Alfred B. (2016-10-01). "Pan-Africanism and Communism: the Communist International, Africa and the diaspora, 1919–1939". Review of African Political Economy. 43 (150): 681. doi:10.1080/03056244.2016.1249707. ISSN 0305-6244.
