= Golden =

Golden means made of, or relating to gold.

Golden may also refer to:

== Places ==
=== United Kingdom ===
- Golden, in the parish of Probus, Cornwall
- Golden Cap, Dorset
- Golden Square, Soho, London
- Golden Valley, a valley on the River Frome in Gloucestershire
- Golden Valley, Herefordshire

=== United States ===
- Golden, Colorado, a town West of Denver, county seat of Jefferson County
- Golden, Idaho, an unincorporated community
- Golden, Illinois, a village
- Golden Township, Michigan
- Golden, Mississippi, a village
- Golden City, Missouri, a city
- Golden, Missouri, an unincorporated community
- Golden Township, Holt County, Nebraska
- Golden, New Mexico, a sparsely populated ghost town
- Golden, Oregon, an abandoned mining town
- Golden, Texas, an unincorporated community
- Golden, Utah, a ghost town
- Golden, Marshall County, West Virginia, an unincorporated community

=== Elsewhere ===
- Golden, County Tipperary, Ireland, a village on the River Suir
- Golden Vale, Munster, Ireland, a fertile agricultural area
- Golden, British Columbia, Canada, a town
- Golden, an incorporated township merged into the municipality of Red Lake, Ontario, Canada
- Golden Bay / Mohua, New Zealand
- Golden Beach (Paros), Greece
- Golden Beach (Hong Kong)
- Golden Beach, Chennai, India
- Golden Hill, Hong Kong
- Golden Mountains (Sudetes), on the border between Poland and the Czech Republic
- 4423 Golden, an asteroid

== Business ==
- Golden Air, a Swedish regional airline
- Golden Artist Colors, an American manufacturer of acrylic paints and mediums
- Golden Books, a division of Western Publishing
- Golden Entertainment, an American operator of casinos, taverns, and slot routes, based in Nevada
- Golden Films, an American film production company
- Golden Records, a New York City record label
- Golden Telecom, a Russian telecommunication company
- Molson Golden, a brand of Canadian beer

== Music ==
- Golden (band), an American rock group
- Golden (singer), a K-R&B Artist

=== Albums ===
- Golden (Rosita Vai album), 2005
- Golden (Kit Downes Trio album), 2009
- Golden (Lady Antebellum album), 2013
- Golden (EP), by Parade of Lights, 2014
- Golden (Romeo Santos album), 2017
- Golden (Kylie Minogue album), 2018
- Golden (Jung Kook album), 2023

=== Songs ===
- "Golden", by My Morning Jacket from It Still Moves, 2003
- "Golden" (Jill Scott song), 2004
- "Golden", by Switchfoot from Nothing Is Sound, 2005
- "Golden", by Fall Out Boy from Infinity on High, 2007
- "Golden", by Monrose from Strictly Physical, 2007
- "Golden", by Tyler, the Creator from Goblin, 2011
- "Golden", by The Wanted from The Wanted, 2010
- "Golden", by Hieroglyphics from The Kitchen, 2013
- "Golden" (Lady Antebellum song), 2014
- "Golden", by Cliff Richard from 75 at 75, 2015
- "Golden" (Travie McCoy song), 2015
- "Golden" (Zayn song), 2016
- "Golden" (Brandon Beal song), 2016
- "Golden" (Kingswood song), 2017
- "Golden" (Kylie Minogue song), 2018
- "Golden" (Harry Styles song), 2020
- "Golden" (Huntrix song), from the movie KPop Demon Hunters, 2025

=== Tours ===
- Golden Tour, a 2018–19 concert tour by Kylie Minogue

== Transportation ==
- Golden Highway, New South Wales, Australia
- Golden Road (Maine), United States, a private road
- Golden Bridge (India), Gujarat, India

== Other uses ==
- Golden (chimpanzee)
- Golden (unfinished film), an unreleased film by Michel Gondry
- Golden (name), a surname and, less frequently, a given name
- Golden (sculpture), a 2013 steel work by Wolfgang Buttress near Tunstall, Stoke-on-Trent, England
- Golden Baseball League, a former California independent baseball league (2004–10)
- Golden F.C., an Indonesian football club based in Merauke, South Papua
- Golden High School, Golden, Colorado, United States
- Golden, a novel by Cameron Dokey
- Hong Kong Golden FC, former name of football club Sun Hei SC

== See also ==
- Chaitanya Mahaprabhu, also known as the Gaura ("Golden One"), a 15th-century Hindu monk and social reformer
- Mas River (Golden River in Javanese)
- Zarrineh River, Zarriné-Rūd means "golden river" in Persian
- Goldeen, a Pokémon
- Golden City (disambiguation)
