= Christoph Hofinger =

Austrian researcher and political consultant

Christoph Hofinger (born 1967 in Innsbruck) is researcher and political consultant in Austria. He directs the research and consulting firm FORESIGHT Research. Hofinger studied literature, psychology and sociology in Vienna. In Austria, he regularly calculates election night forecasts for the Austrian broadcasting corporation ORF. He was President of the European Association of Political Consultants (EAPC) for the term May 2008-May 2010. In 1992, Hofinger also co-founded the Lomographic Society.

== Teaching ==
- 1999 to 2000: Electoral research at the University of Innsbruck
- 2002 to 2007: Social Science Methodology at the University of Vienna
- 2012: Emotions in Politics and Campaigning at the University of Vienna
- 2006 to present: Statistical methods, Questionnaire construction, and Presentation of research findings at SoQua (Vocational Qualification in the Social Sciences)
