= Igor Mintusov =

Russian political consultant

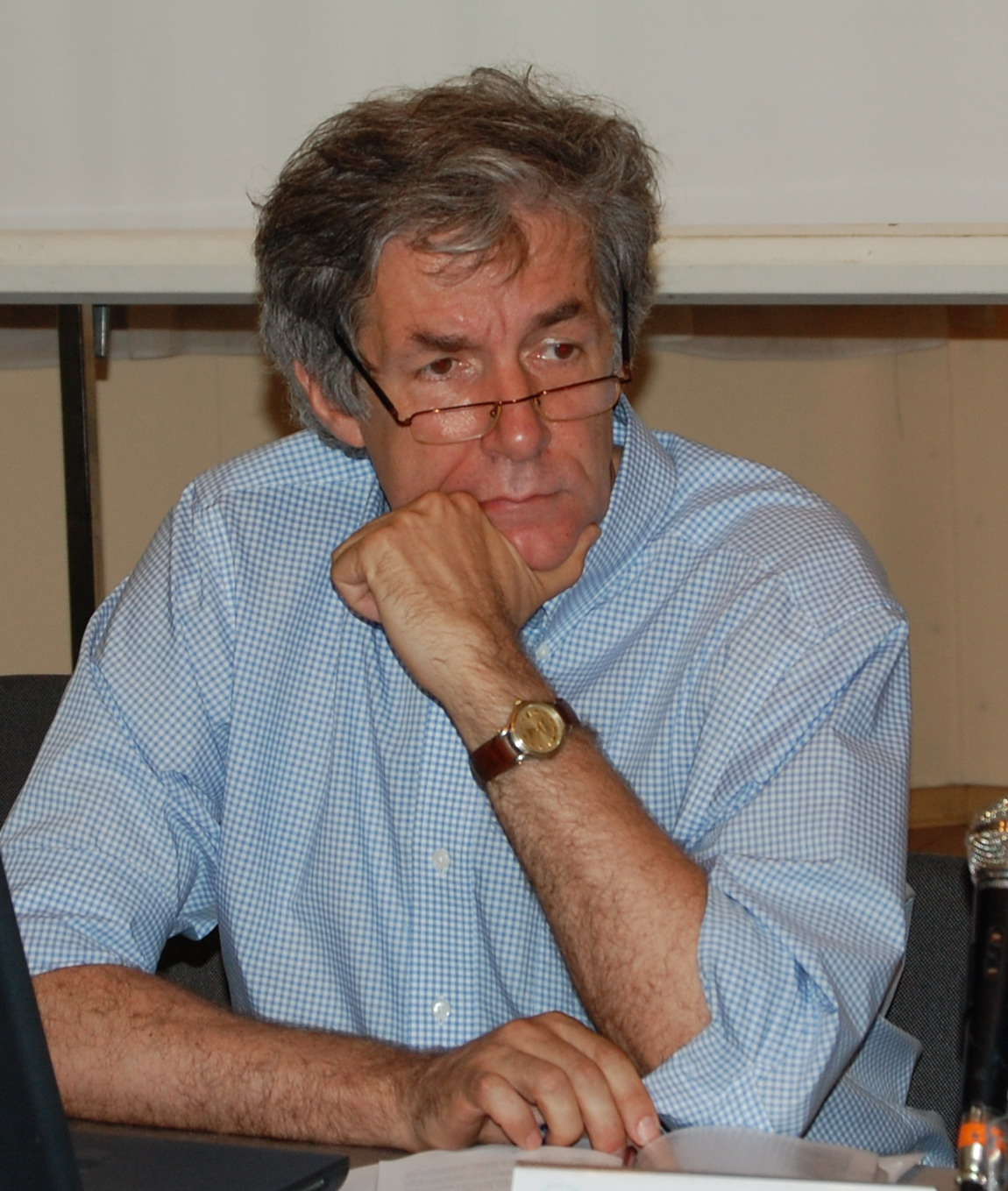
Igor Mintusov in 2010

Igor Yevgenyevich Mintusov (Russian: Игорь Евгеньевич Минтусов; born 17 August 1958) is a Russian political consultant, public relations manager and professional manager of election campaigns. Mintusov is Chairman of the Board of directors of Niccolo M, a public relations company which he established in 1992 with business partner Yekaterina Yegorova-Gantman.

Throughout twenty years of work, Mintusov has supervised over one hundred Russian and foreign election campaigns. He took a part in the preparation for the Russian parliamentary elections in 1993, 1995, 1999, 2003, 2007 and the presidential elections in 1991, 1996, 2000 and 2004. He has worked in parliamentary elections in Poland (1997), Ukraine (2002, 2003, 2007), Mongolia (2004, 2008), USA congressional elections in Florida and Connecticut (1998), parliamentary elections in Latvia (1998), Slovakia (2002), presidential elections in Mongolia (2001, 2005), Nicaragua (2001), Lithuania (2002).

During the Russian presidential election in 1996 he was a personal image consultant to the then President of the Russian Federation, Boris Yeltsin. Mintusov was the first in Russia to use applied qualitative sociological methods in marketing and political studies.

Mintusov served as advisor on the Fair Russia merger.

== Personal life ==
Igor married to Russian journalist and TV presenter Elena Khanga (born in 1962).

== Education ==
- 1980 — graduated from the Economic department of Moscow State University
- 1980–86 — the Central economic-mathematical institute of the USSR Academy of sciences, researcher.
- 1986–88 — Institute of economy and forecasting of scientific and technical progress of the USSR, researcher.
- 1988–89 — Scientific-research centre of the Soviet sociological association, research fellow.
- 1989 — chairman of the Board of directors of the Centre of Political Consulting "Niccolo M" (the name of the "Niccolo M" was registered in 1992.)

== Publications ==
=== Books ===
- Political Consulting (2002), co-edited with Yekaterina Yegorova-Gantman
- Crime without Punishment (2008), about falsifications during the elections of deputies of the State Duma in 2007 and presidential elections of the Russian Federation in 2008.

=== Articles ===
- Byzov, L., L. Gordon, I. Mintusov (1991), Soviet Sociology 30: Reflections of Socialists on the Political Reforms, pp. 29–30

== Non-political projects ==
Support to the campaign the Central Bank of the Russian federation on the ruble denomination (1998), the settlement of the conflict of the French bank Crédit Agricole and National reserve bank (2003), promotion of the Bulgarian company "BRK cosmetics", promotion of the image of the Republic of Cyprus, development of concepts for promoting the brand of the Saratov, Samara, and Tver regions etc.

== Membership of associations ==
A member of the:

- RAPC (Russian Association of Political Consultants) — President
- RASO (Russian public relations association) Vice-president of GR, honorary member, a member of the Supreme expert council
- IABC Member of the strategic board of IABC-Russia

Member of the jury of IABC's biggest international competition on public relations of Gold Quill Awards

- EAPC (European Association of Political Consultants)
- ESOMAR (European Society for Opinion and Marketing Research — the European association of public opinion and marketing research)
- WAPOR (World Association for Public Opinion Research — the World association of public opinion research)
- IPRA (International Public Relations Association, the International public relations association(ipra)
- PRSA (Public Relations Society of America — the American association of public relations)
- YPO (Young Presidents Organization — International organization of young leaders)
- Member of the board of Trustees of the National award in the field of public relations Silver Archer
- Expert and member of the Board of directors MSPS (The Moscow school of political studies)
- The Chairman of the State certifying commission of the Institute of reputation technologies Art-image
- AAPC American Association of Political Consultants
