= European Association of Political Consultants =

Non-governmental organization

EAPC
- The European Association of Political Consultants
- Founded: 1996
- Founder: Sepp Hartinger; Michel Bongrad
- Type: Professional association
- Location: Leibnitz
- Region served: European Union
- Key people: Reza Kazemi; Torbjörn Sjöström; Anthony Grally
- Website: eapc.eu

The European Association of Political Consultants (EAPC) is the professional association of political consultants in Europe, with members from over 20 countries. Although the foundation of The EAPC was started in 1996 in Vienna, the association's current organization was formally established in Leibnitz in 2002. The EAPC is a platform for exchanging ideas between political consultants and is committed to supporting the development of democratic structures in Europe.

The current president is Reza Kazemi from Germany. Vice-presidents are Torbjörn Sjöström from Sweden and Anthony Grally from France.

Past presidents include Gülfem Saydan Sanver, Igor Mintusov, Marko Rakar, Jan Juul Christensen, Gerlinde Manz-Christ of Liechtenstein, Necati Özkan, Christoph Hofinger, Volker Riegger, Mario Ballerini, Andrey Bulychev, Mehmet Ural and Bo Krogvig.

== Activities ==
The EAPC co-organises annual conferences, the EAPC Master Class and the annual Polaris Awards for excellence in the field of political consulting under a number of categories. Entries are accepted from across Europe and prizes in the international categories have been awarded to outfits across the world.

Whilst it takes no commercial position, the EAPC seeks to engender best practice amongst political consultants, particularly when it comes to ethical issues.

Concern about the potential for 'video photoshop' to mislead voters was expressed in the EAPC's London conference in March 2018.

In May 2018, the EAPC commented publicly on the activities of Cambridge Analytica following the firm's use of honeytraps to exert influence on candidates and the wider voting public. The association said in a statement, “Campaign consultants SCL/Cambridge Analytica appear to have crossed the line in terms of professional and ethical responsibilities. There are clearly concerns that have been raised about using “honey-traps” and actions that may have exerted inappropriate influence on both candidates and the voting public. We strongly encourage all members to be fully open and transparent, and to challenge client requests for work that may be less than fair and honest or against the interests of democracy.”

== Members of the Board of Directors of the EAPC ==
The European Association of Political Consultants is led by an elected Board of Directors.

The following people are currently representing the EAPC as Board Members.

Board Member	Country	Position
Reza Kazemi	Germany	President
Torbjörn Sjöström	Sweden	Vice President
Anthony Grally	France	Vice President
Sepp Hartinger	Austria	Treasurer
Selin Özkan	Turkey	Board Member
Igor Mintusov	Russia	Board Member
Arnaldo Costeira	Portugal	Board Member
Reinis Tocelovskis	Latvia	Board Member
Hélèn Masliah-Gilkarov	France	Board Member

== Annual Conference ==
The EAPC holds its annual conference in a different European City each year.

The 15th annual conference was held in Vienna, Austria in 2010.

The 16th annual conference was held in Madrid, Spain in 2011.

The 17th annual conference was held in Dubrovnik, Croatia from May 10 to 12, 2012.

The 18th annual conference was held in Milano, Italy in 2013.

The 19th annual conference was held in St. Petersburg, Russa in 2014.

The 20th annual conference was held in Istanbul, Turkey between 8 and 9 May 2015, with a keynote speech delivered by video link by former Deputy Chief of Staff at the White House and campaign manager for Barack Obama, Jim Messina.

The 21st annual conference was held in Copenhagen, Denmark on 20 and 21 May 2016.

The 22nd annual conference was held in Brussels, Belgium between 28 and 31 May 2017. Keynote speakers included former Greek Prime Minister George Papandreou and former US presidential candidate and DNC chair Howard Dean.

The 23rd annual conference was held in London, UK on 13 and 14 March 2018. Speakers included George Papandreou, former UK Health Minister Stephen Dorrell, Baroness Jenkin and political scientist John Curtice.

The 24rd annual conference was held in Athens, Greece between 30 and 31 May 2019.
