= Gaulden =

Gaulden is a surname of English origin. According to the Dictionary of American Family Names, Gaulden is a variant of Gauldin, which the book suggests is possibly a variant of Golden; however, genetic research shows no connection to the Golden surname going back 6,000 years.

According to YDNA testing, men who carry the surnames Gaulding, Gaulden, or Gauldin are SNP (single-nucleotide polymorphism) R-FTC46937. All Gaulding surname lineages connect back to a man who lived in St. Peters Parish, New Kent County, Virginia, in the 1600s, John Gaulding of New Kent.

== Notable people ==
- Mary Gaulden Jagger (1921–2007), American radiation geneticist, professor of radiology, and political activist
- Rashaan Gaulden (born 1995), American football safety
- YoungBoy Never Broke Again (stage name of Kentrell Gaulden; born 1999), American rapper

== See also ==
- Gaulden Manor, a country house in Tolland, Summerset, England
