= East Germany–Zanzibar relations =

East German–Zanzibar relations
- East Germany: Zanzibar

East Germany–Zanzibar relations concerned historical foreign and bilateral relations between the German Democratic Republic (GDR – East Germany) and the People's Republic of Zanzibar, both of which are now former states. During the short existence of Zanzibar as an independent state, which emerged in the wake of the 1964 Zanzibar Revolution, East Germany was a key ally of the fledgling island state. East Germany initiated a number of assistance programs to Zanzibar, and established its first embassy in Africa on Zanzibar. Once Zanzibar entered into a union with Tanganyika (a former German colony), the issue of relations with East Germany became politically complex.

== Opening of diplomatic relations ==
On 28 January 1964, the Politburo of the Central Committee of the Socialist Unity Party of Germany (SED) approved diplomatic recognition of Zanzibar. On 29 January 1964, the foreign minister of the newly established Zanzibari government Abdulrahman Mohamed Babu sent a telegram to the East German leader Walter Ulbricht announcing Zanzibar's recognition of the GDR. On 30 January 1964, the Council of Ministers of the GDR (Ministerrat der DDR) voted to initiate diplomatic relations with Zanzibar.

On 6–7 February 1964 a West German diplomat reportedly reached a deal with the Zanzibari revolutionary government, whereby West Germany would recognize the new regime on the islands in exchange for a guarantee that no East German embassy would be established. On 12 February 1964, the West German government publicized these guarantees, but the Zanzibari government did not acknowledge the deal. On the contrary, on the same day, the Zanzibari president Abeid Karume received the East German Chargé d'Affaires Günther Fritsch and Second Secretary Gerhard Stein for an audience, at which the East German recognition of the revolutionary government was praised by Karume. The Zanzibari Revolutionary Council reaffirmed its recognition of the GDR. On 19 February 1964, the West German government announced that it was backtracking on their plans to recognize the Karume government.

On 21 February 1964, the Zanzibar government announced that Fritsch had been given permission to assume his functions as the ambassador of the GDR to Zanzibar. Fritsch presented his credentials to President Karume on 5 March 1964. Fritsch thus became the first East German diplomat to take permanent residence as ambassador to an African country. He also became the first ambassador accredited to Zanzibar, and Fritsch would function as the doyen of the diplomatic corps in the republic. The embassy in Zanzibar Town hosted some fifteen East German diplomatic staff members. Horst Köhler served as the Third Secretary at the embassy.

== East German aid efforts ==
During its short period of existence as an independent state, Zanzibar received significant aid from East Germany, whereby modalities for future East German overseas technical, economical and military support missions were developed. East Germany sent nurses, teachers and technical advisers (in finance, banking and planning) to the islands, initiated a construction project for 150 housing units, provided support to radio and print media, provision of fishing vessels, set up a Zanzibari youth brigade and launched projects for canning of fruit and fish products – projects budgeted at a cost of 15 million East German marks (2/3 as loan, 1/3 as in-kind contribution from East Germany). The East German technical aid delegation that arrived in Zanzibar numbered around 50–60 persons. A party organization of the SED was established among the East German expatriates.

In March 1964 the East German financial advisor was appointed as deputy chief of the Zanzibari Ministry of Finance, taking over the role previously played by the British Permanent Secretary Henry Hawker (according to historian Anthony Clayton, Hawker and Gentsch met for an amicable handover session and managed to agree on several points). East German and Soviet personnel also helped train and organize the 600-member revolutionary armed forces of the young island republic.

=== Housing projects ===
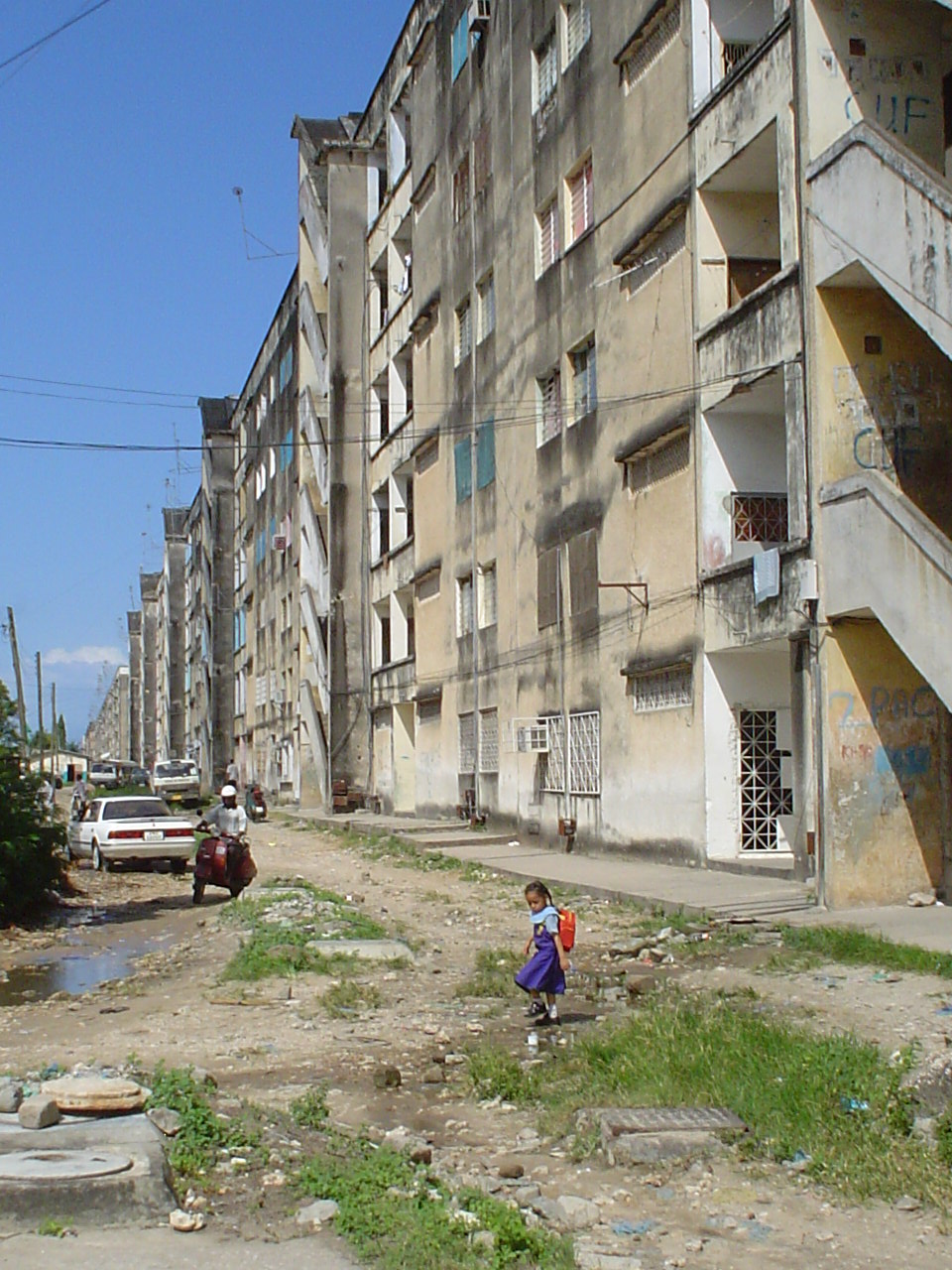
Plattenbauten of the Michenzani housing project

The first East German housing project consisted of building 150 apartments in Kikwajuni, in the south-western fringe of Ng'ambo. The style of architecture was European, using East German plans and East German cement. The Zanzibar-GDR Friendship House, a key component of the East German housing project, was inaugurated in September 1964. The Kikwajuni project was followed by the Kilimani (403 apartments, here the East German apartment design was adapted to fit the generally larger Zanzibari families), as well as a smaller rural housing project (Bambi) and the construction of villas for political leaders.

=== Domestic worker issue ===
The Zanzibari government had issued a regulation that every household of foreign technical experts was required to employ at least one local domestic worker, as a move to combat widespread unemployment. For the most part this labour was performed by men, following the pattern from the British colonial period. In the case of the East Germans, contact with domestic workers was largely managed by the trailing spouses of male technical experts – the East German women who had been working professionals at home, unaccustomed to having domestic servants and lacking foreign language skills. East German party officials reacted sharply to patterns of colonial interaction between the East German women and Zanzibari domestic workers, framing the issue as an ideological problem. A specific party sub-organization was set-up for the trailing spouses, tasked with ensuring correct relations with the domestic workers.

=== Rivalry with China ===
On the islands the East Germans had a complicated relationship with the Chinese – the East Germans suggested a gradual phased program of nationalizations whilst the Chinese urged the Zanzibari government to implement immediate nationalizations. The Zanzibaris eventually heeded the advice of the East Germans over the Chinese. Gentsch expressed concern that parts of the Zanzibari government centered around Ahmed Rashid refused to cooperate with the East Germans, on instructions from the Chinese representatives. The East Germans also accused the Chinese of having distributed an anonymous leaflet, attacking the East German housing project, throughout Zanzibar in April 1964.

== Unification with Tanganyika ==
The unification of Zanzibar and Tanganyika (eventually taking the name Tanzania) on 26 April 1964, posed a dilemma to East Germany, as their diplomatic recognition and close relations with Zanzibar could be threatened. The East German government did not oppose unification publicly, but sought to retain a special relationship with Zanzibar post-unification. The East German government sent Deputy Chairman of the Council of Ministers Paul Scholz to Zanzibar for the 1964 May Day celebrations. Scholz conveyed to the Zanzibari leader the possibility of further East German loans, projects and scholarships. A "solidarity shipment" from East Germany arrived in Zanzibar for the May Day celebrations, including textiles, clothing, shoes, medicines, transistor radios, bicycles, watches and sugar.

After Zanzibar-Tanganyika unification the East German embassy would remain on Zanzibar for some time. All other embassies that had been present in Zanzibar shifted to Dar-es-Salaam. The continuation of the East German embassy on Zanzibar caused tensions between the union president Julius Nyerere (who opposed full recognition of the GDR) and the new union vice-president Karume. West Germany was a major provider of aid to Tanganyika, and per the Hallstein Doctrine, West Germany would not tolerate the establishment of an East German embassy in Dar-es-Salaam. For the most part the West German government was willing to accept the demotion of the East German embassy on Zanzibar to a trade representation, but there was a grouping in the West German Ministry of Foreign Affairs around Alexander Böker who wished that the West German government should have pushed for the complete elimination of East German presence on the islands. West Germany temporarily suspended aid to Tanganyika. A contemporary piece in the Tanganyika African National Union newspaper Nationalist stated that intra-German dispute caused the union to face "one of the thorniest diplomatic problems in the modern world".

== Closure of the embassy and post-script ==
The East German Deputy Foreign Minister Wolfgang Kiesewetter spent several weeks in Zanzibar in January–February 1965, trying to find a solution to the dispute. Through negotiations between Nyerere and Kiesewetter, a compromise was reached – the embassy on Zanzibar was closed in June 1965, substituted by an East German consulate-general in Dar-es-Salaam (with Gottfried Lessing as consul-general) and a consulate on Zanzibar. The decision to replace Fritsch with Lessing was taken at the 11 June 1965 meeting of the Secretariat of the Central Committee of the SED. In the end the establishment of an East German consulate-general in Dar-es-Salaam, in exchange for the closure of the embassy on Zanzibar, was grudgingly accepted by West Germany. East German activities on Zanzibar would come to an end in 1971, with the departure of East European medical staff from the islands.

== In fiction ==
Hans Christoph Buch's 2008 novel Sansibar Blues oder wie ich Livingstone fand ('Zanzibar Blues or how I found Livingstone') deals with the experience of East German-Zanzibari relations in the wake of the 1964 revolution. The novel portrays the experiences of a fictional East German diplomat (and illegitimate son of Duke Adolf Friedrich of Mecklenburg, the German Governor of Togoland prior to World War I) who marries a niece of the ousted Sultan. Buch illustrates a linkage between German imperial colonialism and East German involvement in Zanzibari affairs during the revolution.
