= Abdullah Kassim Hanga =

Zanzibari politician

Prime Minister of Zanzibar
- In office 12 January 1964 – 27 April 1964
- Preceded by: Muhammad Shamte Hamadi (monarchy)
- Succeeded by: Post abolished

Personal details
- Born: 1932
- Died: 1969 (aged 36–37) Zanzibar
- Party: Afro-Shirazi Party
- Spouse: Lily Golden (m. 1960)
- Children: Yelena Khanga
- Occupation: Politician

Abdullah Kassim Hanga (1932–1969) was the only Prime Minister in the history of the People's Republic of Zanzibar and Pemba from 12 January 1964 to 27 April 1964. He was executed without trial for an alleged 1967 plot to overthrow the Karume regime in the now united new country of Tanzania.

He was the husband of Soviet activist Lily Golden, whom he was married to until his death in 1969. They had a daughter together, Russian journalist Yelena Khanga.
