= Necati Özkan =

Turkish political consultant

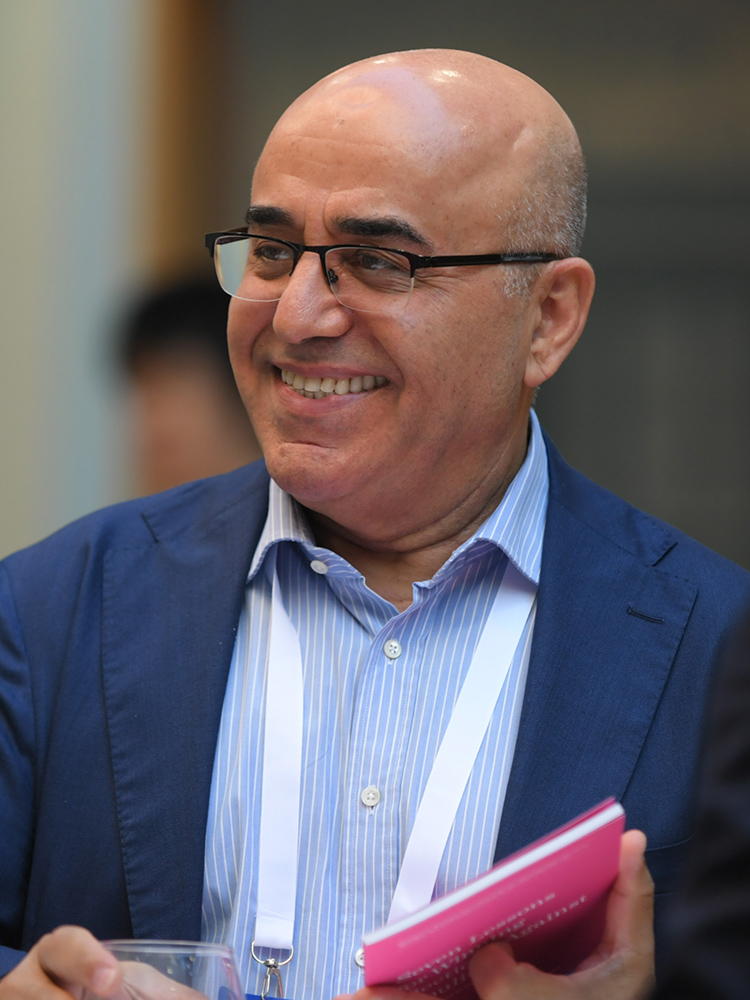
- Özkan in June 2024
- Born: May 20, 1960 (age 66); Ankara, Turkey
- Education: Turkish Military Academy; Ankara University (LL.B.)
- Occupations: Strategist, advertising executive, political consultant, campaign manager, author
- Years active: 1985–present
- Spouse: Pelin Özkan (m. 1987)
- Children: 2
- Website: necatiozkan.com.tr

Necati Özkan (born May 20, 1960, in Ankara), Turkish strategist, advertising executive, political consultant, campaign manager, and author.

Strategist and political communications consultant who has won over 80 international awards, Özkan served as the global president of Dialogue International, a network of independent advertisement agencies, from 2012 to 2015; president of the European Association of Political Consultants (EAPC) from 2014 to 2016, and board member and vice president of the International Association of Political Consultants from 2020 to 2024. He directed campaigns for many politicians and political parties in Turkey and abroad, including those of Kemal Kılıçdaroğlu and Ekrem İmamoğlu.

== Education ==
Özkan was born the third of six siblings on May 20, 1960. He was enrolled at Istanbul's Kuleli Military High School in 1974, then switched to Işıklar Military High School, which was opened the same year in Bursa. Özkan went on to study at the Turkish Military Academy between 1977 and 1981. He graduated from the Turkish Military Academy on August 30, 1981, and was commissioned into the Turkish Armed Forces as an artillery lieutenant. He was forced into mandatory retirement in mid-1983 with nearly 2,000 other commissioned officers in compliance with the "trilateral decree" issued by the generals who came to power following the coup d'état of September 12, 1980, based on political reasons. Özkan studied at the Faculty of Law at Ankara University from 1983 to 1987, and later, at the Department of Business Administration at Middle East Technical University from 1997 to 1999.

== Career ==
Özkan founded Öykü Advertising Agency in 1985. He directed communication campaigns for many national and international brands, public institutions and organizations, and the Turkish Armed Forces. His career took off in Ankara and continued to Istanbul, where he moved in 2000. He ran tourism-oriented promotional campaigns for Turkey in 22 countries from 2008 to 2013. He also led destination campaigns for EXPO 2020 Izmir, the Ankara Shopping Festival, the 2013 Mediterranean Games, and EXPO 2021 Hatay. Özkan served as the global president of Dialogue International (later renamed Comm-Unity) from 2012 to 2015.

In addition to his career in commercial communication, he has been taking active roles in the election campaigns of political personalities, leaders, and parties in almost every election since 1983. Özkan worked in the campaigns of the Social Democracy Party of Turkey (SODEP) and the Social Democratic Populist Party (SHP) candidates in 1983, 1987, and 1991. He was part of the election campaigns of the Republican People's Party (CHP) in 1995. In 2009, he ran the gubernatorial campaign of Kemal Kılıçdaroğlu for the mayorship of Istanbul, national campaigns for CHP Headquarters in local elections of 2014, then the election campaigns for Ekrem Imamoğlu in 2014 and 2019. Özkan acted as a political consultant and campaign director in local and national election campaigns in the Turkish Republic of Northern Cyprus, Kyrgyzstan, Georgia, and Hungary. He organized strategy, political communication, and campaign management training programs for political parties in Kazakhstan, Georgia, and Kyrgyzstan. Özkan has been a lecturer at Gazi University, the Eastern Mediterranean University, Maltepe University, Bahçeşehir University, and Işık University over the course of the last 20 years. He still teaches a strategy course in the Marketing Communication Master's Program at Istanbul Bilgi University.

Özkan was elected to serve as president of the European Association of Political Consultants (EAPC) from 2014 to 2016, and vice president of the International Association of Political Consultants (IAPC) from 2020 to 2022, then again in 2022 and 2024. He published articles on election campaigns in Takvim and Milliyet newspapers and wrote a column for Radikal between 2015 and 2016. Currently, he writes a column for Cumhuriyet. He commented on many newspaper articles and live broadcasts on many television channels about elections in Turkey and abroad.

== 2025 arrest ==
After a seizure order was established on the real estate and bank account registered under his name on 7 March 2025, Özkan was one of the business figures arrested alongside Ekrem İmamoğlu on 19 March 2025 by Turkish Police on charges related to alleged corruption along with more than 100 people.

Initially, he was incarcerated in Marmara Prison. He was transferred to Kocaeli Prison on April 13, where he awaits indictment.

== Works ==
- Özkan, Necati (2014-02-03). Seçim Kazandıran Kampanyalar [Campaigns That Win Elections] (in Turkish). Istanbul: MediaCat Books. ISBN 9789758378760.
- Özkan, Necati (2009-01-19). Obama'nın Liderlik Sırları [Obama's Leadership Secrets] (in Turkish). Istanbul: MediaCat Books. ISBN 9786055755072.
- Özkan, Necati (2019-10-30). Kahramanın Yolculuğu [Journey of a Hero] (in Turkish). Istanbul: MediaCat Books. ISBN 9786052314272.
