= Tiglachin Monument =

Ogaden War memorial in Addis Ababa, Ethiopia

Tiglachin
- ትግላችን
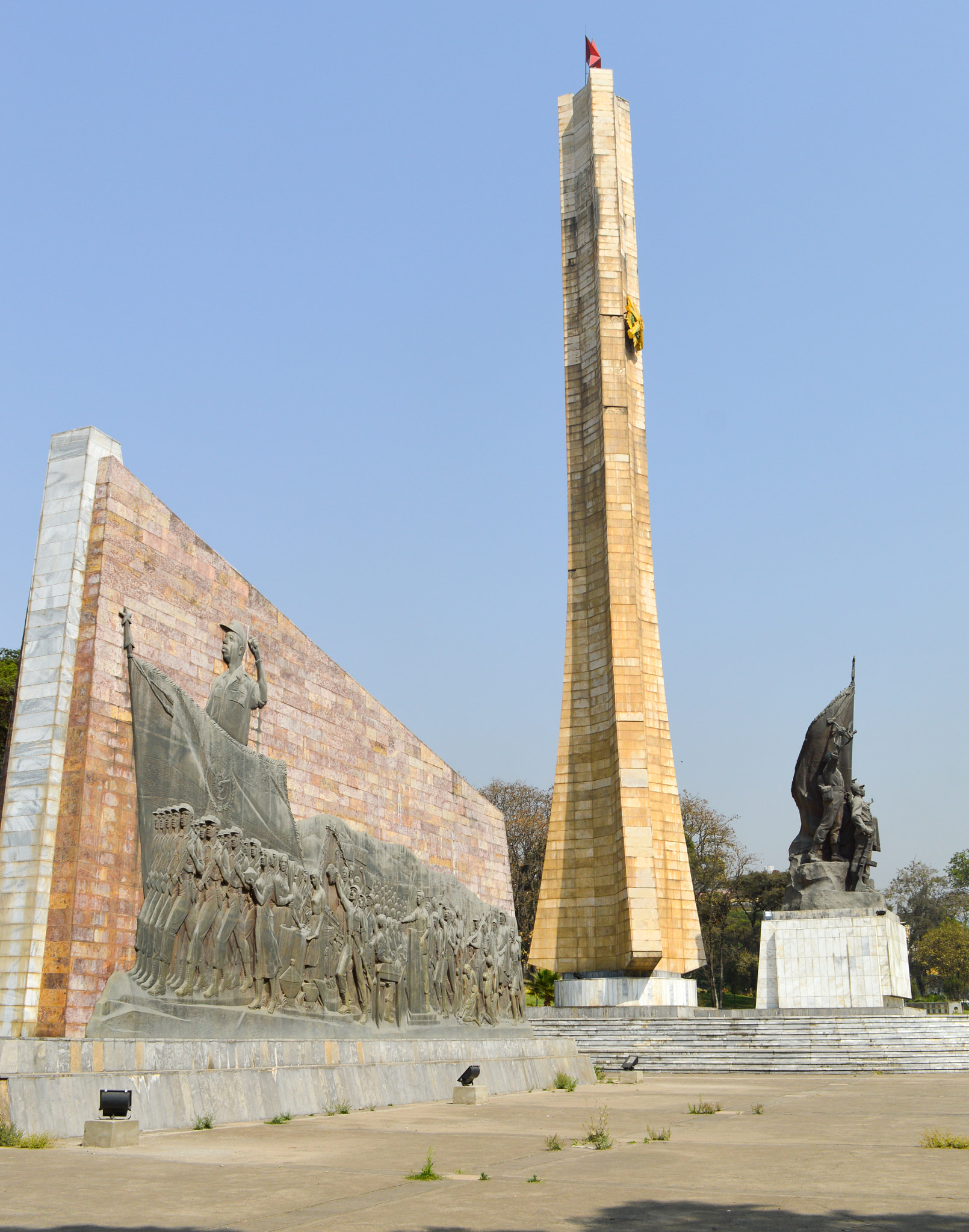
- Interactive map of the Tiglachin area

General information
- Type: Monument
- Location: Addis Ababa, Ethiopia
- Coordinates: 9.019937°N 38.752265°E
- Inaugurated: 12 September 1984

Height
- Tip: 50 m (160 ft)

Dimensions
- Other dimensions: 50,000 m^{2} (grounds)

The Tiglachin Monument (Amharic: ትግላችን ሐውልት, lit. 'Our Struggle Monument'), also known as the Derg Monument (Amharic: ደርግ ሐውልት), is a memorial to Ethiopian and Cuban soldiers involved in the Ogaden War. It was built during the rule of Mengistu Haile Mariam and on Churchill Avenue in Addis Ababa, Ethiopia. The monument has a central statue, a 50-metre-tall (160 ft) pillar, two wall reliefs on the sides and two squares where the portraits of Cuban soldiers are visible. Some sculptures at the monument was given by the North Korean government in 1984, and was one of the project’s first monuments to be donated to Africa.

== History ==
The monument sits in front of the Black Lion Hospital. The monument was inaugurated on 12 September 1984, the tenth anniversary of the overthrow of Haile Selassie. The statuary was donated by North Korea, and was manufactured by the Mansudae Art Studio. Currently, the monument grounds are overgrown and the monument has suffered from neglect (which some say is deliberate) under the EPRDF government, which overthrew the Derg. Some have suggested that it be demolished.

== Description ==
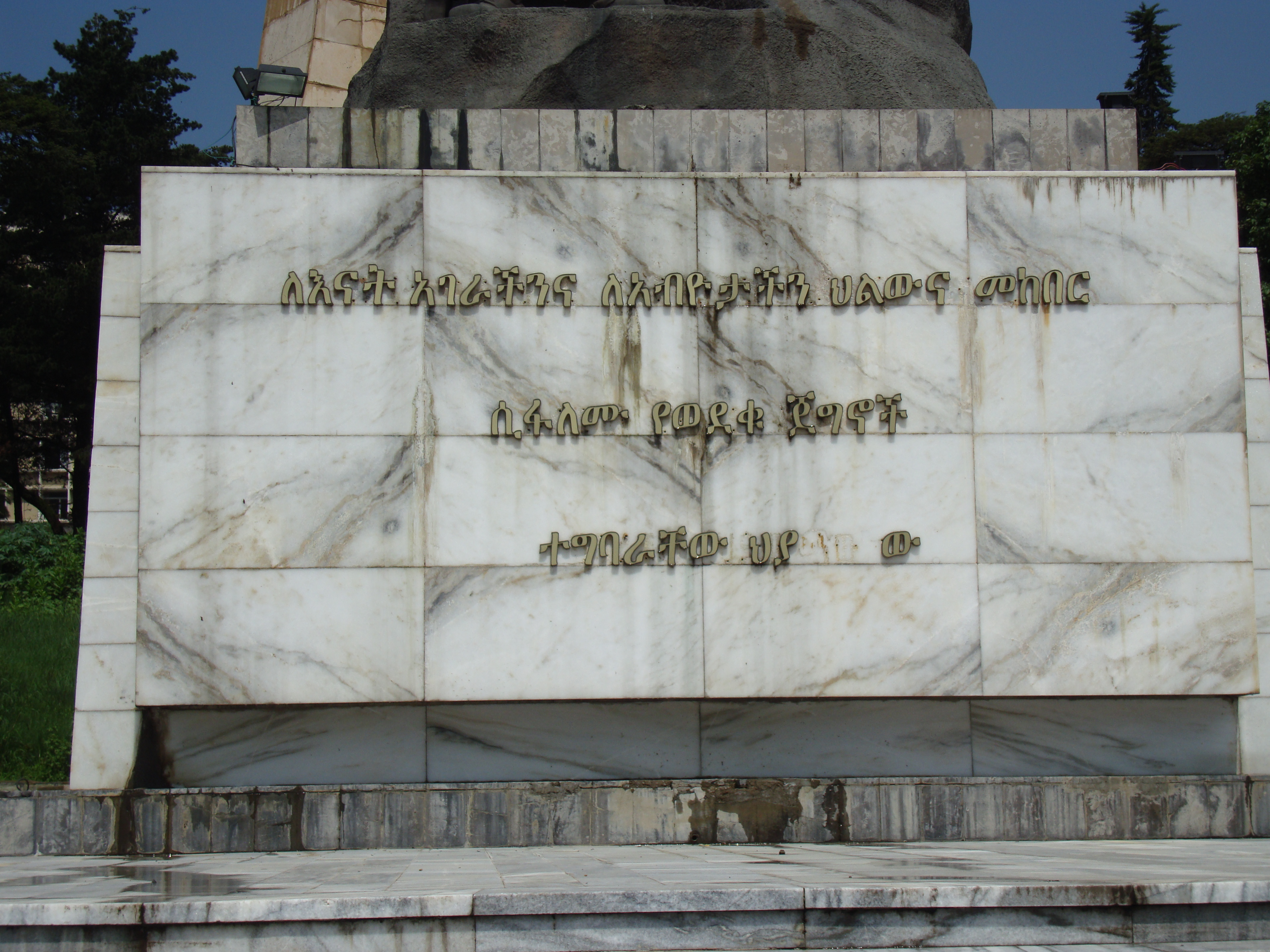

The central statue depicts three armed people (two men and a woman) and the hammer and sickle flag of Marxism. It sits on a pedestal on which is written in Amharic:

"ለእናት አገራችንና ለአብዮታችንን ህልውና መከበር
ሲፋለሙ የወደቁ ጀግኖች
ተግባራቸው ህያው ነው"

It is likely that characters are missing for the last line as of a space that can be seen, the complete version could be: ተግባራቸው ህያው ነው. The inscription would thus read:

"The actions of the heroes who fell in the struggle for life and respect for our homeland and our revolution are immortal."

The main pillar in the back is decorated with a depiction of the Heroes' Medal, the highest honour of Communist Ethiopia, which weighs 700 kilograms and has a diameter of 2.7 m. To the left and to the right of this pillar are wall reliefs. The left wall relief, deeply affected by the Marxist style, represents the revolutionary process with Mengistu Haile Mariam (top left) in military uniform at his head.

On the right, Emperor Haile Selassie I is depicted on horseback, ignoring the people who suffer from hunger, then moving to the left, we see the protests with an English inscription "Down with imperialism" and some demonstrators overthrowing the throne, symbol of the Ethiopian Empire. Finally, on the left, the people seem to be liberated and ready to support his army. The wall to the right of the pillar relief also marked by the Marxist style, is more general way, the Ethiopian people guided by Mengistu Haile Mariam, in the background, you can see various buildings including the National Bank of Ethiopia.

Finally, further to the left and right of the two frescoes are two small squares where you can see portraits of Cuban soldiers present in the conflict because of the alliance between the Ethiopian regime and that of Fidel Castro.
