= Space Flight Europe-America 500 =

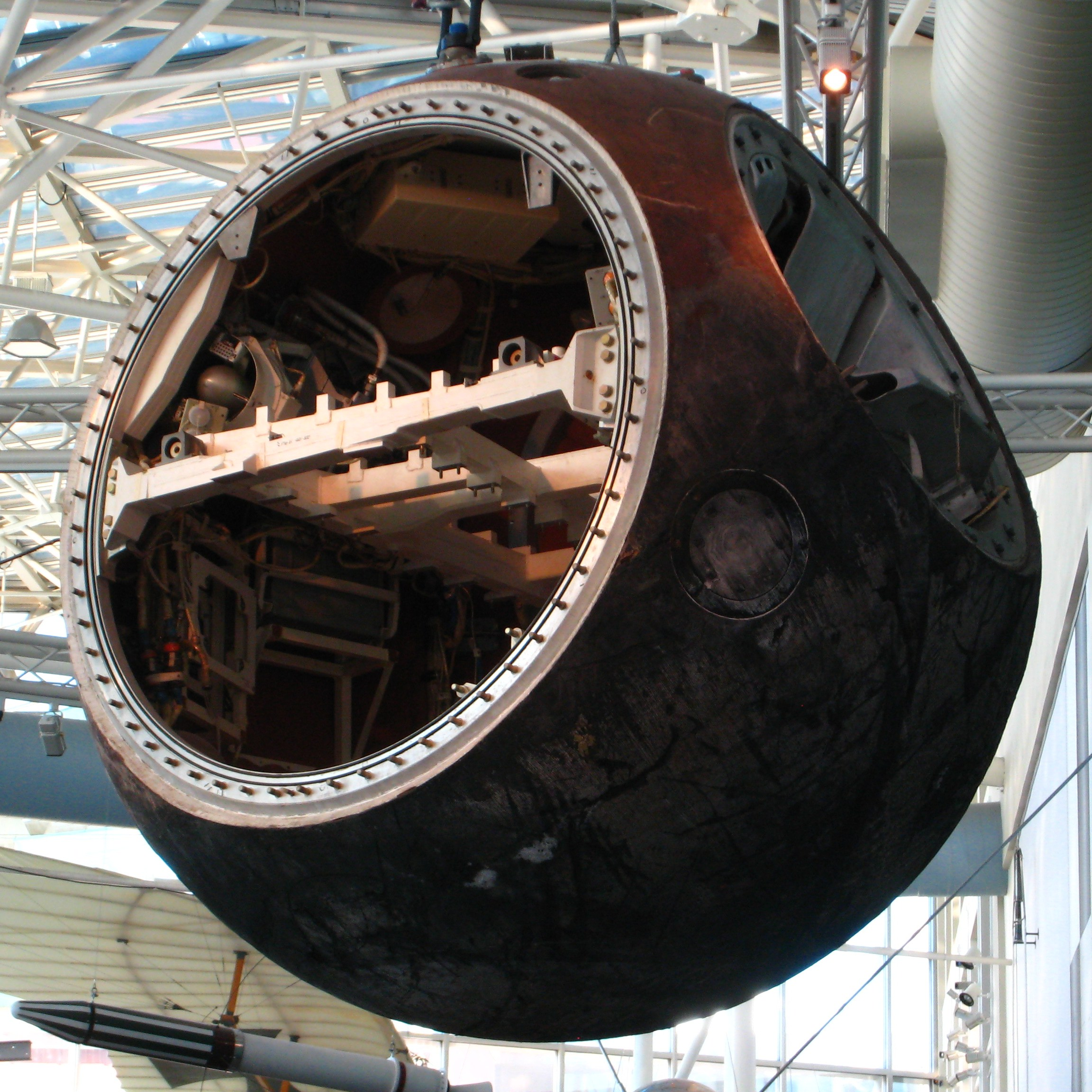
Resurs 500 Capsule at the Museum of Flight.

Space Flight Europe-America 500 was a goodwill mission conceived in 1992 as the first private, commercial spaceflight by the Russian Foundation for Social Inventions and TsSKB-Progress, a Russian rocket-building company, to increase trade between Russia and USA and promote the use of technology once reserved only for military forces.

The idea of a space launch to be carried out in the International Space Year, the 500th anniversary of Columbus's arrival in the Americas, the 35th anniversary of the Earth's first artificial satellite launch, and the 35th Anniversary of the Treaty of Rome establishing the European Community belonged to Alexander Bazlov, a spacecraft designer, and was supported by Gennady Alferenko, the president of the Foundation for Social Inventions.

The effort was pulled off by the private sector, with the support of the governments from both countries. Money for the launch was raised from a collection of Russian companies who paid the military for the hardware.

Bob Walsh, an entrepreneur and humanitarian who helped bring the Goodwill Games to Seattle, heard of the plan while visiting Moscow in 1991 and agreed to sponsor it in the U.S. He worked with U.S. authorities to clear the way for the capsule recovery and delivery to Seattle, which had been a closed city to Russian ships since World War Two.

On November 16, 1992, at 0:52 a.m. MSK, a Soyuz rocket fired an 8-foot-diameter (2.4 m), 5,152-pound spherical Resurs-500 capsule similar to the one flown by Cosmonaut Yuri Gagarin, from Russia's once-secret Plesetsk Cosmodrome.

The satellite orbited the Earth for seven days before parachuting into the Pacific Ocean about 120 miles off Grays Harbor on the Washington state coast on November 22 at 10:32 a.m. PST. The space capsule was scooped up and brought to Seattle by a 680-foot Russian missile-tracking ship Marshal Krylov.

The ship docked at 9 a.m. on November 24 at Pier 42 of the Port of Seattle, where it was met by government officials, including Mayor Norm Rice and Washington's secretary of state Ralph Munro, school children, bands, and local residents as well as 330 Russian dignitaries, business leaders, scientists, journalists, and space officials, including Cosmonaut German Titov, the second Russian in space, who arrived in Seattle by charter flights.

Inside the capsule were 19 neon-orange containers with gifts, souvenirs, business products, artwork, religious icons, messages of peace also few hundred of bills of 1 rouble, the last one from the Soviet Union. Among other things, there were Russian Orthodox Church icons for the Saint Spiridon Orthodox Cathedral; Digswell the Space Dog, a stuffed toy based on a British cartoon character, a crystal sculpture of the Statue of Liberty; peace messages from the Dalai Lama, Russian president Boris Yeltsin, and leaders of European nations; a Christmas present for President Bill Clinton; and samples of Russian products. Also, there were two wedding rings from a Russian couple who got married at St. Spiridon Cathedral, after retrieving their rings from the capsule.

The space capsule was towed in the Bon Marche holiday parade and was set on display at the Museum of Flight at Boeing Field, where it has been residing ever since.

In the course of the event, a Russian-American Business Opportunity Conference was held at the Seattle Sheraton, and art and photo exhibits were on display. On Thanksgiving, Rotary Club members and church groups hosted the Krylov's 450 sailors and the 330 Russian visitors at their homes. Marshal Krylov, a previously top-secret vessel, was open to the public for several days. According to organizers, it was the first time anyone from the general public, including Russian civilians, had been allowed on board.

== Entrepreneur exchange program ==
The flight helped start important social development initiatives, including a Russian-American entrepreneur exchange program, operated by the Europe-America 500 Consortium (Russia) and the International Research and Exchanges Board (USA) to promote the development of small and medium-sized businesses in Russia. The program was coordinated by the Russian Federal Employment Service and the United States Information Agency.

While all citizens of the Russian Federation, irrespective of specialty, occupation, or employment status, who were up to 40 years old, were eligible to apply to an open competition to be selected, unemployed people and women had been given priority. During the course of the program, over 10,000 young people had been sent for 4-6-week internships in the United States for developing entrepreneurial skills and gaining experience. A great deal of them had started businesses upon return to Russia.

== Sources ==
- Space - Rocketing Toward Peace, The Seattle Times, November 2, 1992
- State To Welcome Russia Missile, The Seattle Times, November 14, 1992
- From Russia, With Love: 'Peace Rocket' Heads to U.S., Los Angeles Times, November 16, 1992
- Russian goods rocket into America, NewScientist, November 21, 1992
- Russian Capsule Strictly Business, The Seattle Times, November 22, 1992
- Seattle Greets A New Order -- Soviet Capsule, Visitors Symbolize Good Will, The Seattle Times, November 23, 1992
- From Russia, With Ambition -- Seattle-Bound Russian Ship Hauls In Capsule, The Seattle Times, November 23, 1992
- 'Friendship Rocket' From Russia Lands, Los Angeles Times, November 23, 1992
- Russian Ship Bears Cargo Of Good Will -- Vessel Docks Here To Open Peace Visit -- Crew To Present City With Gift-Laden Missile, The Seattle Times, November 24, 1992
- Jello And Other Strange American Customs -- Russians Savor First Thanksgiving, The Seattle Times, November 27, 1992
- From Russia With Love - Via Space -- Men Of The Sea, On Solid Ground, Open Capsule From Air, The Seattle Times, November 29, 1992
