= Jerry Golden =

Jerome Edward Golden (February 8, 1923 - January 8, 2003) was a 35-year broadcaster who reported shots fired at President John F. Kennedy's motorcade in Dallas, Texas while broadcasting for ABC Radio over WLS in Chicago, Illinois.

A Chicago native, he served in the Marines at the Tarawa atoll in 1943. By 1946 he was at WHBY in Appleton, Wisconsin, and soon worked as program director at WLIP in Kenosha, Wisconsin. By 1957 he worked in Chicago at WBBM, then at WLS in 1959, and at WGN in 1970 from where he retired in 1981. He was a ten-year board member of AFTRA, the American Federation of Television and Radio Artists.

In 1985, Jerome appeared as a contestant on The Price Is Right and, notably, won the game Ten Chances with only three guesses (The fewest necessary to win, and was the first contestant to perform this feat).
