= Center for Citizen Initiatives =

- Formation: 1983
- Website: https://ccisf.org

The Center for Citizen Initiatives is a nonprofit organization focused on citizen diplomacy. It began in 1983 to try to reduce tensions between two major superpowers, the United States and the Soviet Union.

== History ==
The organization began when a group of Americans led by Sharon Tennison went to the Soviet Union in 1983 to talk with ordinary people there. When they returned, they spoke about their trip publicly, then formed a nonprofit organization called the Centre for U.S.-U.S.S.R. Initiatives (CUUI). The nonprofit's travel program took 1,000 American citizens to the Soviet Union on the condition that they would spend six months speaking about their experience afterward. In 1987 the organization began bringing people from the Soviet Union to the United States as part of a program called "Soviets, Meet Middle America" (SMMA). While initially the organization largely brought Communist Party officials on these trips, after working with Gennadi Alferenko they were able to bring the friends they had made during previous visits instead, a notable feat since most non-Communist Party members were not able to travel internationally. Some of the events put on as part of the program were protested by American anti-communist activists. Despite that, participants in the program reacted positively and came away from it with fewer negative stereotypes about their counterparts.

The Center for Citizen Initiatives also started several programs in the Soviet Union, such as the Productivity Enhancement Program, which was a business and entrepreneurship education program. The program ended due to financial difficulty in 2009, after the termination of State Department grants and the global financial crisis.

== Support for Russian Leader ==
While advocating for peace, Tennison has repeatedly championed Russia’s President. For example, in 2018, she wrote, “Putin isn’t the problem, friends. The problem is the projection of our own ‘shadow’ on Putin and Russia.” In September 2020, Tennison observed, “Putin seems to ignore detractors and continues efforts to create venues to bring peoples and countries together despite vilifications.” And the day after Russia’s invasion of Ukraine, Tennison posted, “I am deeply concerned about a NATO country being on Russia’s borders in Ukraine … As for Putin’s current dilemma, I’m sorry he felt he had to intervene in Ukraine!”
