= Foundation for Social Inventions =

American-based foundation

The Foundation for Social Inventions of the USSR was founded in 1986 by Gennady Alferenko, a social innovator and entrepreneur, to launch initiatives for turning Russia into an open civil society. In 1986, Mikhail Gorbachev contacted Gennady Alferenko after reading his article on a national campaign to facilitate innovators and change-makers, and asked him to set up a national fund promoting social innovations. Alferenko established the Foundation for Social Inventions at the Komsomolskaya Pravda newspaper, as a readers' voluntary association.

The Foundation invited the newspaper's 20 million readers to send their proposals for social inventions. In the first year, more than 30,000 innovative ideas were received, for which a computerized idea bank was created. Some promoted citizen diplomacy, others focused on domestic social problems. Alferenko then invited people to donate money in support of the best ideas. An easy to remember all-Union bank account number 708 was established to enable financial and material contributions. Response was enthusiastic. For example, 9.7 million rubles were collected for the "Duty" (Dolg) project to build a center for physical and social rehabilitation for veterans of the Afghanistan war.

== Foundation for Social Innovations, USA ==
In 1989, Alferenko established the Foundation for Social Innovations, a 501(c)(3) not-for-profit in the US. Henry Dakin, chairman of the Dakin Company and philanthropist, and Peter Goldmark, then President of the Rockefeller Foundation, supported the idea and provided organizational support. Initial funding was provided by the Rockefeller Brothers Fund, Ford, and Charles Stewart Mott foundations. FSI had offices in Juneau, San Francisco, and New York City.

== Notable projects ==
=== Space Flight Europe-America 500 ===
The Space Flight Europe-America 500 was a private spaceflight conceived in 1992 with the aim of increasing trade between Russia and USA. The flight was followed by a Russian-American entrepreneur exchange program promoting development of small and medium-sized businesses in Russia. During the course of the program, over 10.000 young unemployed people had been sent for 4–6-week internships in the United States for developing entrepreneurial skills and gaining experience.

=== Friendship Flight '89 ===
In 1989, The Foundation sponsored 11-year-old Tony Aliengena's flight across the Soviet Union with stops in towns, normally closed to foreigners. That was one of the many projects FSI sponsored in an effort to open closed Soviet societies through people-to-people diplomacy.

=== Soviets Meet Middle America ===
In 1988, Sharon Tennison's Center for Citizen Initiatives partnered with FSI in a first-ever, non-governmental citizen exchange program, Soviets Meet Middle America. Over a two-year period, 400 Soviet citizens in small groups of four persons traveled to 265 American cities where they stayed in some 800 private homes, and were interviewed by thousands of American newspapers, radio and TV programs.

== Umbrella function ==
In the U.S.S.R., people had difficulties in forming private associations because there was no law that would allow for the creation of a non-governmental organization. FSI, with a structure designed to create self-propagating communities of support for entrepreneurs and innovators, had a unique mandate to launch new organizations under its auspices, and used it to establish and provide organizational and financial support to over 300 non-governmental organizations, including the Union of Chernobyl Liquidators, the Folk Warriors Association of Social Programmes, which focused on helping miners and their families, the Russian Union of Afghanistan Veterans, the Flight Safety Foundation International, Stas Namin Centre, and Interfax.
