= Francis Goolden =

Royal Navy officer

Rear-Admiral Francis Goolden CB
- Born: Francis Hugh Walter Goolden; 1885
- Died: 1950 (aged 64–65)
- Military career
- Allegiance: United Kingdom
- Branch: Royal Navy
- Rank: Rear-Admiral
- Commands: HMAS Sydney; HMS London; HMS Ganges
- Conflicts: World War I World War II

Francis Hugh Walter Goolden (1885–1950) was a Royal Navy officer who served during the First and Second World Wars.

He commanded the light cruiser Sydney in 1926–1927 and then commanded the heavy cruiser London in 1934–1937. Goolden retired in 1937, but was recalled to active duty when the Second World War began in 1939 to command the training base HMS Ganges in 1939–1940.

== Bibliography ==
- Halpern, Paul G., ed. (2016). The Mediterranean Fleet, 1930–1939. Publications of the Navy Records Society. Vol. 163. London: Routledge for the Navy Records Society. ISBN 978-1-4724-7597-8.
