= Peter Allen Golden =

American writer

Peter Golden
- Born: Newark, New Jersey, U.S.
- Education: University at Albany, SUNY (BA)
- Occupations: Author, historian, journalist, blogger
- Website: www.petergolden.com

Peter Allen Golden is an American author, historian, journalist, and blogger. He is the author of 9 full-length works of non-fiction and fiction, and five books of interactive fiction. He is best known for his writings on the Cold War and his interviews with world leaders.

== Early life and education ==
Golden was born in Newark, New Jersey, to Jewish parents. He lived in Stuyvesant Village in Union Township, Union County, New Jersey. He moved to South Orange, New Jersey, where he attended South Orange Junior High School before moving to Maplewood and graduating from Columbia High School. He attended Ohio University for two years then transferred to University at Albany, SUNY, where he graduated with a Bachelor of Arts degree in philosophy.

== Career ==
=== Nonfiction writing ===
In his 1992 book Quiet Diplomat, Golden described how, in 1975, U.S. President Gerald Ford and U.S. Secretary of State Henry Kissinger asked industrialist and political insider Max Fisher to help heal a diplomatic rift between the United States and Israel over relations with Egypt. He also reported on a 1965 visit Fisher made to U.S. President Dwight D. Eisenhower’s Gettysburg farm during which Eisenhower told him that he regretted pushing Israel to pull out of the Sinai. This fact was essentially unknown to historians until Golden wrote about it, and Fisher’s claim was backed up by President Richard Nixon, who during his interview with Golden said:

"Eisenhower. . . in the 1960s told me—and I am sure he told others—that he thought the action that was taken [at Suez] was a mistake."

In 2000, Golden co-wrote a memoir called I Rest My Case, chronicling the life of J. Stanley Shaw, one of the preeminent bankruptcy attorneys in the United States.

Some of his writings have appeared in Detroit Free Press Magazine, New Jersey Monthly, Microsoft eDirections, Beyond Computing, The Forward, and Capital Magazine.

His blog, titled Boardside: Dispatches from the Education Wars, was a provocative online diary that chronicled his experiences serving as a Board of Education member in the Guilderland Central School District in Upstate New York. According to the Times Union (Albany), New York State School Boards Association spokeswoman Barbara Bradley said that school board members are within their rights to create blogs like Golden's, and, although she was not aware of any others in New York state in the year 2007, she expected many more in the future.

For Quiet Diplomat and O Powerful Western Star, Golden interviewed the following notable world leaders:

- U.S. President Richard Nixon
- U.S. President Gerald Ford
- U.S. President Ronald Reagan
- U.S. President George H. W. Bush
- U.S.S.R. President Mikhail Gorbachev
- U.S. Secretary of State Henry Kissinger
- U.S. Secretary of State Alexander Haig
- U.S. Secretary of State George Shultz
- U.S. Secretary of State Lawrence Eagleburger
- Israeli Prime Minister Yitzhak Shamir
- Israeli President & Prime Minister Shimon Peres
- Israeli Prime Minister Yitzhak Rabin

His history of the Cold War titled O Powerful Western Star was published in 2012.

In 2016, Golden served as ghostwriter for Keep Swinging: A Memoir of Politics and Justice detailing the life of Senator Joseph L. Bruno.

=== Fiction writing ===
In the 1980s, Golden wrote five interactive fiction novels for computers as part of a joint venture between Imagic and Bantam called the Living Literature series. His first interactive computer novel, Another Bow, was a Sherlock Holmes mystery set aboard the S.S. Destiny and was a Waldenbooks best-seller for many weeks.

In March 2011, Comeback Love was purchased for publication by Atria books, an imprint of Simon & Schuster. It was published in early 2012.

His next novel, Wherever There is Light, was published on Nov. 3, 2015 by Atria books, an imprint of Simon & Schuster.

On April 10, 2018, Nothing Is Forgotten was published.

Golden is working on a historical thriller about the John F. Kennedy 1960 presidential campaign.

== Reactions and criticisms ==
Writing for Commentary magazine, Leonard Garment, former special counsel to President Richard Nixon, described Golden's Quiet Diplomat as a “meticulously researched and gracefully written book” that “gives us a concrete view of the emergence of American Jews into the mainstream of national politics since World War II.”

Writing for The Jerusalem Report, J.J. Goldberg called Golden's Quiet Diplomat “a disturbing, challenging book. It suggests, without answering, a wide range of questions about the relationship between the American Jewish community and its ‘leadership,’ and between the Diaspora community and the state of Israel. What is the Jewish community's role in U.S.-Israel relations? Can Israel trust representatives over whom it has no control? Whom do these “Jewish leaders” represent? In the end, Fisher and [Peter Golden] leave their readers free to draw their own conclusions.”

Criticizing Golden’s Boardside blog, John Dornbush, then serving as Guilderland Central School District Board of Education Vice President, told the Times Union (Albany) that the website was inappropriate and that “It shows a lack of respect for others on the board.” On the other hand, Board member Barbara Fraterrigo told the same reporter that Golden's blog is a reflection of free speech in the modern age and is another means to give the public information. New York State School Boards Association spokeswoman Barbara Bradley also told the same reporter that "School board members have a right to speak as individuals" and "This is another vehicle for them."

== Awards and honors ==
In 1989 Golden won the New York State Bar Association’s Media Award for a critical profile he wrote of Judge Joseph Harris.

== Personal life ==
Golden is married to Annis Golden, a communication professor at SUNY Albany. He has one son. He served as a board of education member of the Guilderland Central School District.

== Bibliography ==
Nonfiction

- Quiet Diplomat: A Biography of Max M. Fisher (1992)
- I Rest My Case: My Long Journey from the Castle on the Hill to Home A Memoir by J Stanley Shaw with Peter Golden (2000)
- Shoshanna (2009)
- O Powerful Western Star (2012)

Novels

- Comeback Love (2012)
- Wherever There is Light (2015)
- Nothing Is Forgotten (2018)

Interactive fiction

- Another Bow (1985)
