= New York State School Boards Association =

Coordinates: 42°46′12.91″N 73°45′33.77″W

- Founded: 1896
- Type: Educational
- Purpose: Public education in New York
- Location: Latham, New York
- Region served: New York
- Members: About 5,200
- Key people: Sandra H. Ruffo, President
- Website: http://www.nyssba.org

The New York State School Boards Association (NYSSBA) serves as the statewide voice of more than 700 boards of education. The collective influence of some 5,000 school board members, who constitute half the elected officials in the state, enables NYSSBA to work toward the benefit of the elementary and secondary public school system in New York. School board members are the educational leaders of their communities; they determine policies that govern the operation of their local public school system.

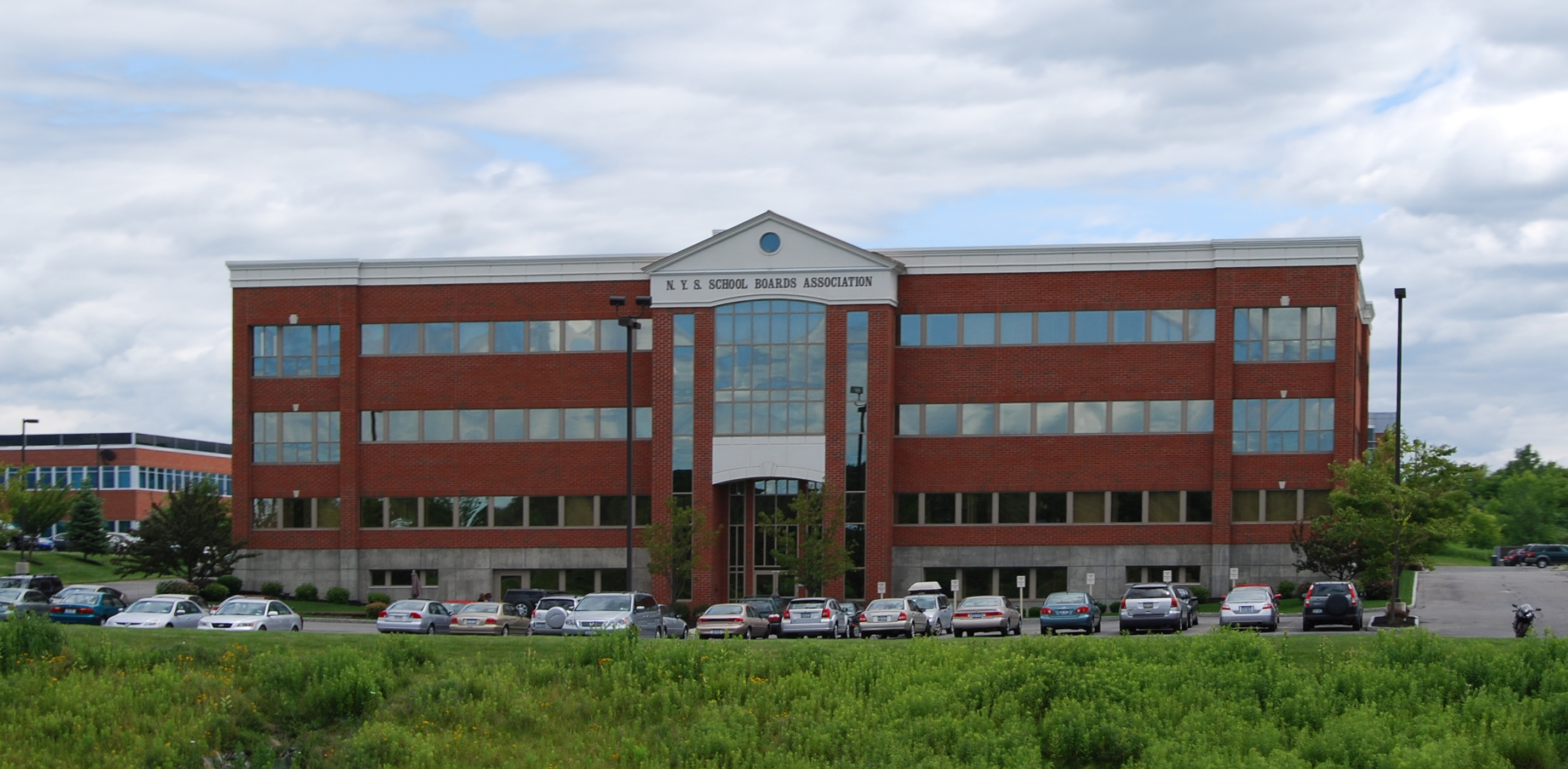
NYSSBA headquarters in Latham

NYSSBA provides current information and advice on matters affecting school boards and cooperates with other educational and related organizations in promoting excellence in education. NYSSBA provides advocacy information, leadership development, and custom services to public school boards.

NYSSBA was founded in 1896 in Utica, New York, as the New York State Association for School Boards. In 1920 it was known as the State Association of School Boards and Trustees of New York State.

By 1929 it became the Associated School Boards and Trustees of the State of New York. In 1932 this organization merged with the New York State Association of Central Rural School District Boards to form the New York State School Boards Association. Incorporation took place on December 12, 1935, and the organization's official name became the New York State School Boards Association, Inc.

The expenditure of public funds payable as dues to NYSSBA was given a legal foundation in Education Law by the state legislature in 1945.

== See also ==
- New York City Department of Education
- Education in New York (state)
- National School Boards Association
- New York State Education Department
- List of school districts in New York
- No Child Left Behind Act
