= Oliver Golden =

American-born agronomist (1887–1940)

- Born: November 18, 1887; Yazoo County, Mississippi, U.S.
- Died: 1940 (aged 52–53); Tashkent, Uzbek SSR (now Uzbekistan)
- Occupations: Agronomist; politician
- Spouse: Jane Wilson (died 1924) Bertha Bialek (died 1940)
- Children: 2, including Lily

Academic background
- Education: Tuskegee Normal and Industrial Institute; Communist University of the Toilers of the East

Academic work
- Institutions: Tashkent Institute of Irrigation and Melioration

Oliver John Golden (Russian: О́ливер Джон Го́лден; November 18, 1887 – 1940) was an American and Soviet agronomist and politician. Born in Yazoo County, Mississippi, he studied cotton at the Tuskegee Normal and Industrial Institute. A member of the Communist Party USA, he spent time in Soviet Russia and was later part of a delegation of cotton experts who arrived in the Uzbek Soviet Socialist Republic at the invitation of the Soviet government. During that time, he worked in cotton cultivation, was a teacher at the Tashkent Institute of Irrigation and Melioration, and served as a municipal councilor in Tashkent. Eventually, he and his wife remained in the Soviet Union and became naturalized Soviet citizens.

== Biography ==
Oliver John Golden was born in Yazoo County, Mississippi on November 18, 1887. He was the son of Catherine and Hilliard Golden, the latter of whom became one of the state's wealthiest Black landowners after being freed from slavery by the Thirteenth Amendment to the United States Constitution. (Note: Sources differ on Catherine's race: although Nassor Said Ali says that she was Native American, the 1900 Census says that she was Black.) The family fled to nearby Alabama after being targeted by two Ku Klux Klan arson attacks. He studied cotton at the Tuskegee Normal and Industrial Institute and left as a non-graduate to fight at the Western Front for the United States Army. Afterwards, he relocated north to Chicago, where he found work as a railroad waiter.

Golden joined the Communist Party USA, and in 1924, a high-ranking Communist International leader invited him to Russia, where he was educated at the Communist University of the Toilers of the East from 1925 until 1928. After the 1924 death of his first wife Jane Wilson, Golden had a child with his Udmurt nurse Anya. He later married fellow communist Bertha Bialek, a Polish-born, Jewish American labor activist whom he had met while the two were in prison after taking part in a political demonstration. They had a child, Lily Golden.

Golden was inspired to participate in a Soviet experiment involving the recruitment of Black people and later heard about a complete lack of African Americans within a similar delegation of engineers invited to work at the Soviet Union. Subsequently, he requested the involvement of George Washington Carver, a professor from his time at Tuskegee, and Amtorg Trading Corporation, with whom he worked to recruit cotton experts to the Soviet Union. In 1931, the Soviet Union invited the delegation to the country, including Golden and his wife. The delegation later settled in Yangiyoʻl, having decided on the Uzbek Soviet Socialist Republic due to its cotton industry and the Uzbek people's similar experiences with racism.

During his time in the Uzbek SSR, Golden helped cultivate a faster-maturing version of American cotton and worked as a teacher at the Tashkent Institute of Irrigation and Melioration. In civic life, he worked as a municipal councilor in Tashkent and an advocate for the Scottsboro Boys. The Golden couple hosted Langston Hughes during Christmas Eve 1932 when he was returning from Moscow after an abandoned film project.

Golden and his wife became naturalized Soviet citizens, staying in the country after the other delegates returned home in 1934. Golden died from heart failure in Tashkent in 1940.
