= Gennady Alferenko =

Soviet and Russian social innovator (born 1948)

- Born: Gennady; 15 December 1948; Sovkhoz 42, Omsk Oblast, Soviet Union
- Education: Novosibirsk State University
- Known for: Prominent figure of civil society movement of the USSR; Founding social innovation movement in the USSR; Founding the Foundation for Social Inventions of the USSR; Founding Europe-America 500 consortium.
- Spouse: Irina Alferenko
- Children: Olesia

Gennady Alferenko (Russian: Генна́дий Петро́вич Алфере́нко; born December 15, 1948) is a Soviet and Russian social innovator; in 1970 he established Terpsichore, the first local community organization registered as a legal entity in the USSR; in 1985 he established the Foundation for Social Inventions of the USSR, and in 1987, the foundation for Social Innovations USA.

== Education and career ==
Gennady Alferenko studied Geology and Geophysics at the Novosibirsk State University from 1966 through 1973. During this period, in 1970, Alferenko founded Terpsichore, a ballet club, which was the first local community organization registered as a legal entity in the USSR. Terpsichore organized events with performances of Soviet and world culture stars, such as Galina Ulanova, Maya Plisetskaya, Ekaterina Maximova, Alicia Alonso, Vladimir Vasiliev, Maris Liepa, and Mikhail Baryshnikov. Also, he established a network of 450 local foundations to provide financial, organizational, and legal support to youth initiatives across the Soviet Union. From 1973 through 1985 Gennady Alferenko headed the NSU's oil and gas deposits research team in Eastern Siberia and on Sakhalin island.

In 1985, following Alferenko's publication on an idea of a national campaign to facilitate innovators and change-makers, Mikhail Gorbachev pledged his support and invited Gennady to Moscow to set up a national fund promoting social innovations. Alferenko established the Foundation for Social Inventions at the Komsomolskaya Pravda newspaper, as a readers' voluntary association, to implement initiatives facilitating creation and establishment of an open civil society. The Foundation for Social Inventions established and provided organizational and financial support to over 300 non-governmental organizations using a unique mandate to launch new organizations under its auspices. Some of the initiatives that Gennady Alferenko launched with the FSI, were Siberia-Alaska in 1988, and Space Flight Europe-America 500 in 1992.

Siberia-Alaska was a project to establish a visa-free travel regime for native families in order to reunite Soviet and American Yupik Eskimos in Chukotka, and open direct flights between Siberia, Russian Far East, Alaska and California. Before, those who wished to travel legally across the Bering Strait had to go round the world.

Europe-America 500 was the first ever private spaceflight which was conceived with the aim to promote the use of technology once reserved for military forces. It was followed by a Russian-American entrepreneur exchange program promoting development of small and medium-sized businesses in Russia. During the course of the program, over 10.000 young unemployed people had been sent for 4-6-week internships in the United States for developing entrepreneurial skills and gaining experience.

In 1987, Gennady Alferenko established the US Foundation for Social Innovations, which, jointly with the FSI of the USSR, launched the first student exchange programs between the USSR and the USA for 100.000 students, and organized a meeting of the Vietnam War US veterans and Afghanistan War Soviet veterans to develop mutual support programs and establish joint business ventures, such as manufacturing of prosthetics and wheelchairs.

In 1989, Alferenko together with the Esalen Institute organized Boris Yeltsin's first trip to the United States, arranging meetings for Yeltsin with President George H. W. Bush, Vice President Dan Quayle, National Security Advisor Brent Scowcroft, former President Ronald Reagan, and many other leaders in business and government. The trip covered eleven cities and fulfilled Yeltsin's dreams of seeing the Statue of Liberty and an example of a free enterprise economy.

In mid-1990s, Alferenko had developed recommendations for Prime Minister Yevgeny Primakov to establish a state-owned company Rosneft. At the time, he had also been a founder and president of the club of friends of the Bolshoi Theatre.

In 2000, Alferenko organized Ring-2000, a civic initiative to create a National idea bank for the new President of Russia, Vladimir Putin. The main events were held in Russia concert hall in Moscow linked with 33 Internet centers in universities across Russia, and were broadcast on national TV.

Since 2000, Gennady Alferenko has been a member of board of directors of Standard Bank, a board member of Valery Gergiev Charitable Foundation, and strategic advisor to national and international companies such as Gazprombank, Ernst & Young, DLA Piper, and PwC. In 2016, he became a member of the board of directors at Hancock Jaffe Laboratories, a U.S. based company developing bioprosthetic medical devices providing treatments for cardiothoracic procedures.
