= 1957 Zanzibari general election =

General election in Zanzibar

General elections for the Legislative Council were held in Zanzibar for the first time in July 1957. It was largely a contest between the Afro-Shirazi Union and the Zanzibar Nationalist Party, with the ASU and its supporters winning five of the six contested seats. They were also the first elections to be held in East Africa.

== Background ==
In 1926 the British colonial authorities introduced Legislative and Executive Councils to the islands, preventing the Sultan from legislating without their consent. In 1954 the number of members of the council was expanded to 12. Two years later the British authorities appointed Walter Coutts to advise the government on how to obtain public representation on the council, albeit as "unofficial" members. Coutts' report suggested election of six members based on a list system, with candidates limited to property owners, people over 40, and those with a specific level of education, and that voters should meet the property criteria. This proposal meant that only 14% of the islands' population were eligible to vote.

== Campaign ==
The main parties were the Zanzibar Nationalist Party, which had been established in December 1955, and the Afro-Shirazi Union, founded in February 1957 by a merger of the African Association (founded in 1934) and the Shirazi Association (1938), whilst the Indian-dominated Muslim Association also competed.

== Results ==
The election was characterised by significant interest, and voter turnout was 90.2%.

Party	Votes	%	Seats
Afro-Shirazi Union	13,052	36.91	3
Independents (Shirazi Association)	9,237	26.12	2
Zanzibar Nationalist Party	7,761	21.95	0
Independents (Zanzibar Nationalist Party)	3,221	9.11	0
Independents (Muslim Association)	519	1.47	1
Independents (Afro-Shirazi Union)	392	1.11	0
Independents (Comorian Association)	55	0.16	0
Independents	1,124	3.18	0
Total	35,361	100.00	6
Valid votes	35,361	98.28	
Invalid/blank votes	619	1.72	
Total votes	35,980	100.00	
Registered voters/turnout	39,873	90.24	
Source: Lofchie, Nohlen et al.

=== By constituency ===
Constituency	Candidate	Party	Supported by	Votes	Notes
Ngambo	Abeid Karume	Afro-Shirazi Union	Afro-Shirazi Union	3,328	Elected
Ngambo	Ali Muhsin Barwani	Zanzibar Nationalist Party	Zanzibar Nationalist Party	918	
Ngambo	Ibuni Saleh	Independent	Comorian Association	55	
Pemba North	Ali Sharif Mussa	Independent	Shirazi Association	3,386	Elected
Pemba North	Rashid Hamadi Athumani	Zanzibar Nationalist Party	Zanzibar Nationalist Party	3,182	
Pemba North	Shaaban Sudi Mponda	Afro-Shirazi Union	African Association	657	
Pemba South	Muhammad Shamte Hamadi	Independent	Shirazi Association	5,851	Elected
Pemba South	Rashid Ali el-Khaify	Zanzibar Nationalist Party	Zanzibar Nationalist Party	1,488	
Pemba South	Abdulla Seuleiman Ali Busaidy	Independent	–	1,075	
Stone Town	Sher Mohammed Chowdhary	Independent	Muslim Association	519	Elected
Stone Town	Rutti A. Bulsara	Zanzibar Nationalist Party	Zanzibar Nationalist Party	494	
Stone Town	Anverali Hassan Virji	Independent	Afro-Shirazi Union	392	
Stone Town	Abdul Qadir Mukri	Independent	–	49	
Zanzibar North	Daud Mahmoud	Afro-Shirazi Union	Afro-Shirazi Union	3,687	Elected
Zanzibar North	Haji Mohammed Juma	Independent	Zanzibar Nationalist Party	3,221	
Zanzibar South	Ameri Tajo	Afro-Shirazi Union	Afro-Shirazi Union	5,380	Elected
Zanzibar South	Amour Zahor Said	Zanzibar Nationalist Party	Zanzibar Nationalist Party	1,679	
Source: Lofchie

== Aftermath ==
Following the election, both the ZNP and ASU experienced infighting, resulting in some ASU members leaving to establish the Zanzibar and Pemba People's Party in 1959, and some ZNP members leaving to form the Umma Party in 1963.

In 1960 Sir Hilary Blood was appointed Constitutional Commissioner by the British authorities, with the remit to advise the government on constitutional development in Zanzibar. His proposals included making the leader of the party with the most seats Chief Minister, for ministerial portfolios to be created, for the council to have 22 constituency-based seats, that electoral qualifications should be abolished, and that women should have the right to vote.

The British government accepted Blood's proposals, and fresh elections were held in January 1961.
