= Chake-Chake =

Town and capital of Pemba South Region in Tanzania

Coordinates: 5°14′45″S 39°46′0″E

- Town
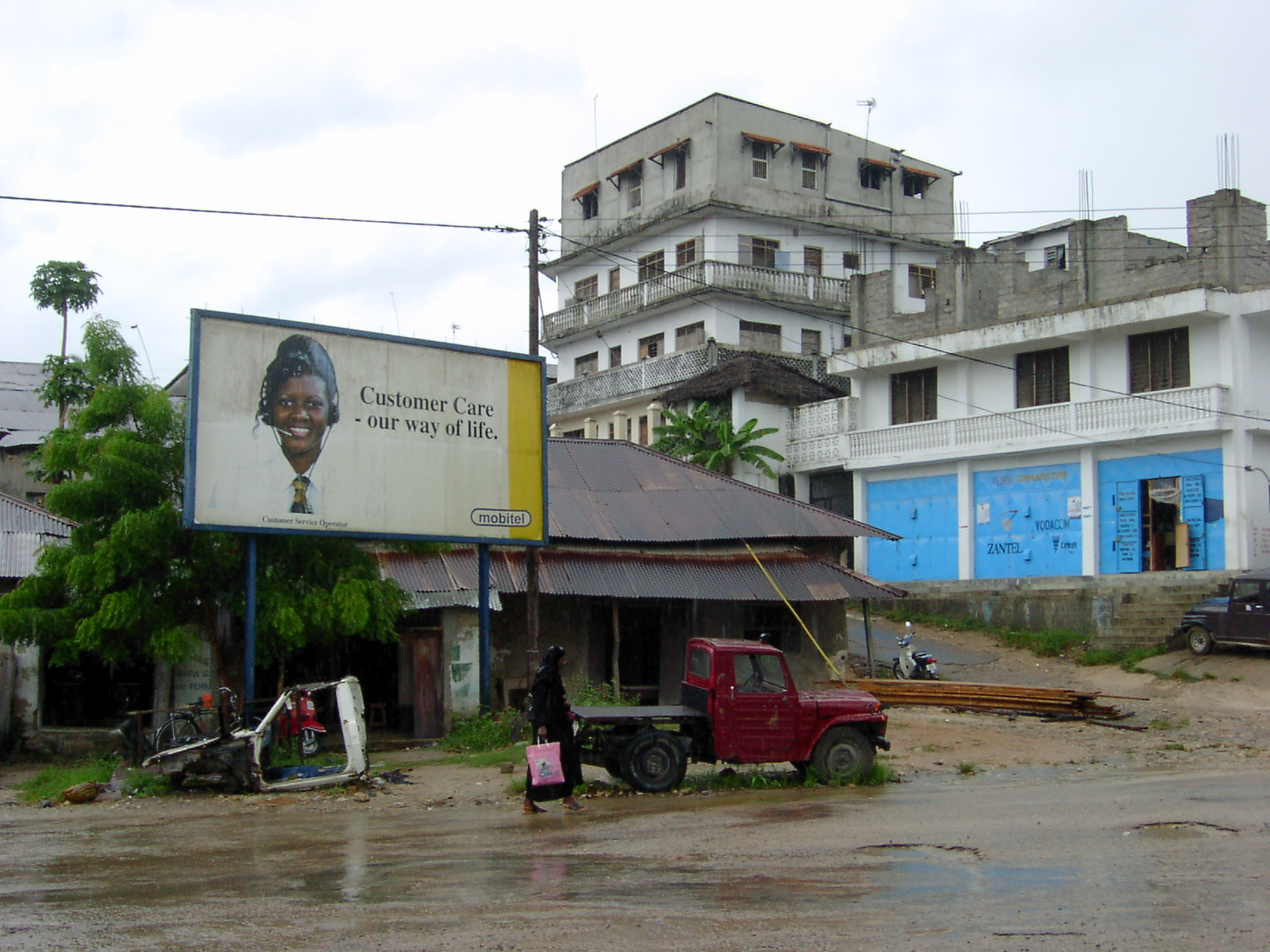
- A rainy day in Chake-Chake, Tanzania

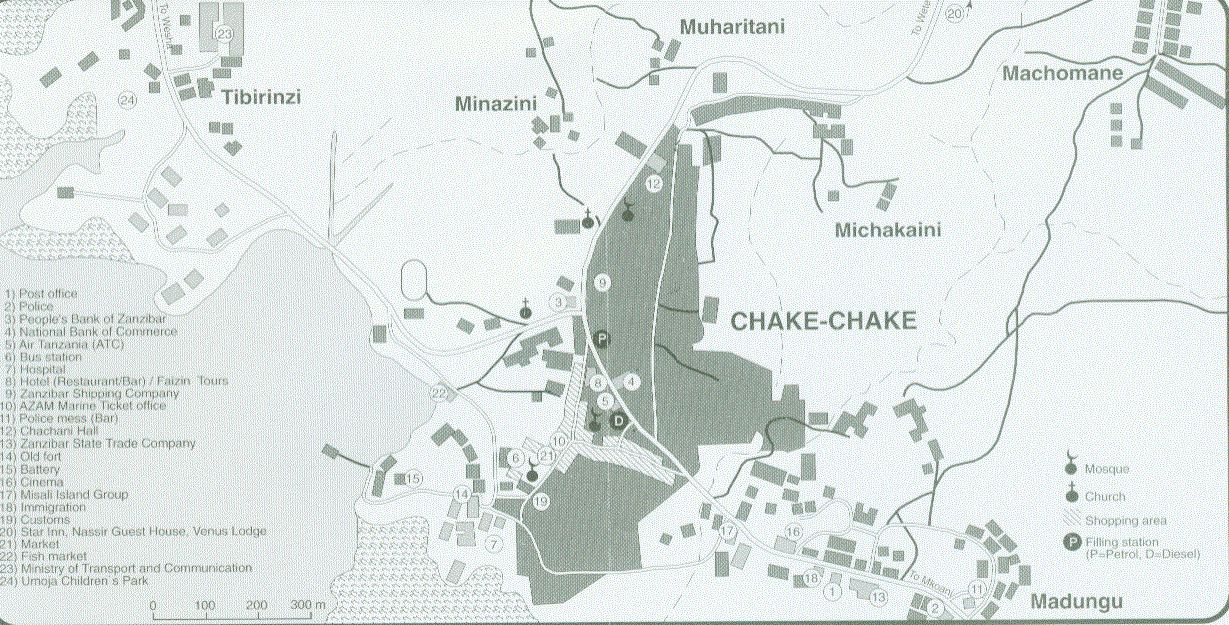
- Map of Chake-Chake
- Country: Tanzania

Population (2022 census)
  - Total: 52,047
- Time zone: UTC+3 (EAT)
- Website: www.tanzania.go.tz

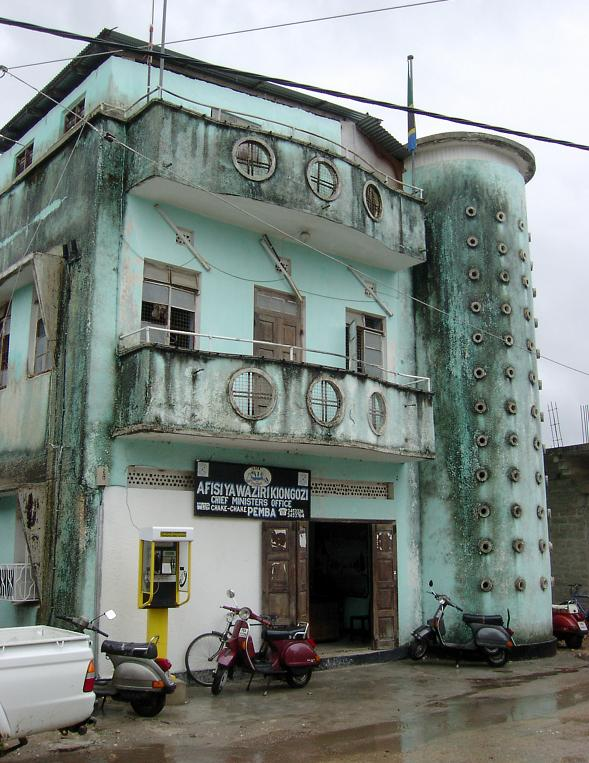
The Chief Minister's Office of Zanzibar's Revolutionary Government in Chake-Chake

Chake-Chake is the administrative and commercial capital of the Tanzanian island of Pemba. The town is located within the Chake Chake District. It is in the centre of a deep indentation in the west coast called Chake-Chake Bay. In addition to being the capital, Chake-Chake is also the seat of Pemba's court. Pemba's only airport is 7 km south-east of Chake-Chake. In 2022, the population of the Chake-Chake metropolitan area was 136,298.

== History ==
Chake-Chake was first occupied between 1500 and 1600. Today, it houses the Pemba Museum, preserving artifacts that reflect Pemba’s cultural heritage.

== Demographics ==
The Chake-Chake metropolitan area had a population of 97,249 according to the 2012 census.

== Politics ==
The January 1961 election saw the Afro-Shirazi Party (ASP) win a plurality of 1,538 votes against the Zanzibar Nationalist Party's (ZNP) 1,537 votes and the Zanzibar and Pemba People's Party's (ZPPP) 819 votes. The ZNP won a majority in the June 1961 and 1963 elections.

== Infrastructure ==
By 2022, there were 29,938 buildings in the area with 26,874 being single storey, 2,723 under construction, and 341 being multi-storey. 27,190 of these buildings were residential, 847 were residential and commercial, and 1,901 were non-residential.

== Economy ==
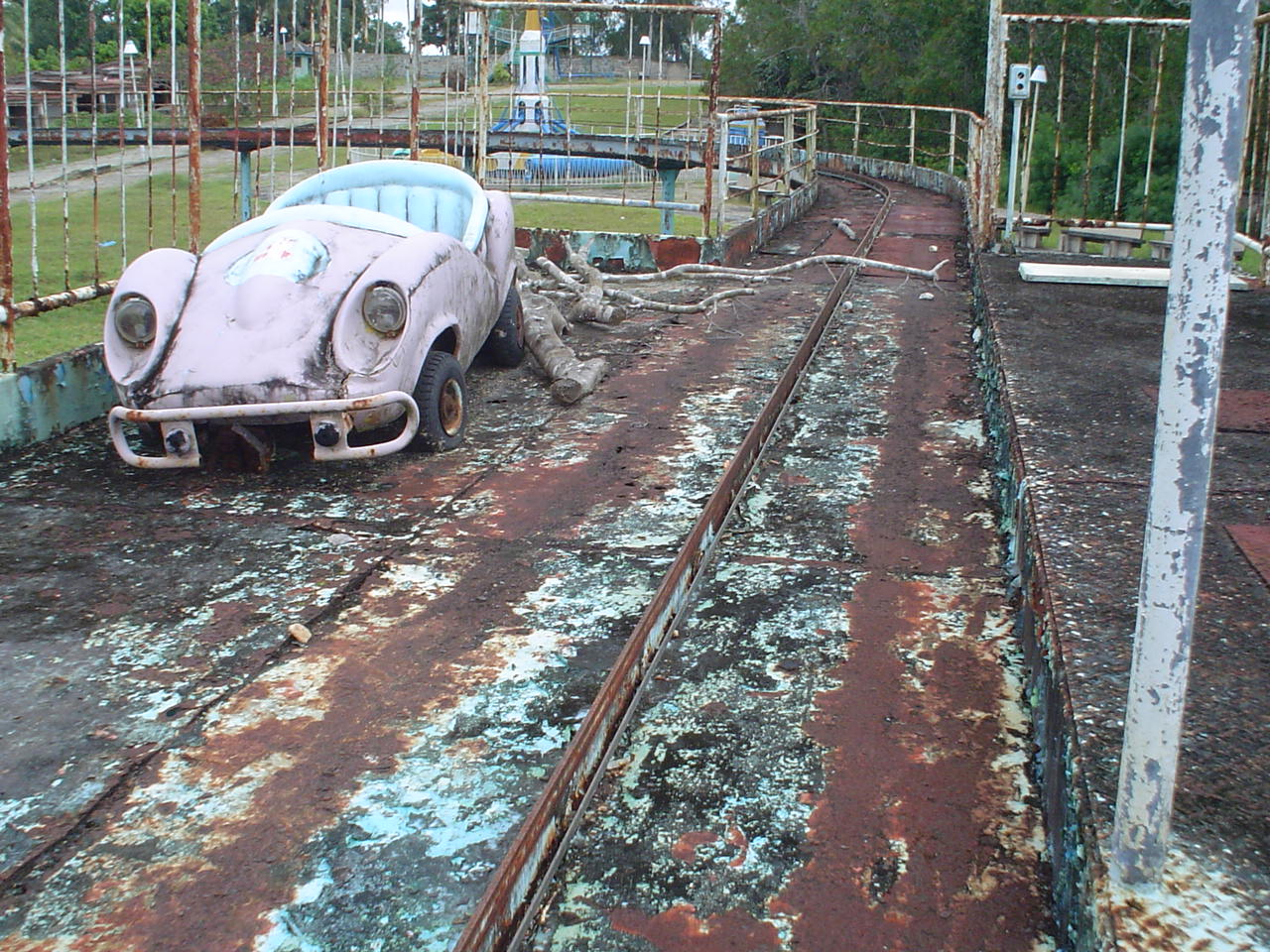
Umoja Children's Park on the outskirts of Chake-Chake

Tourism is growing steadily, with Chake-Chake serving as a gateway to Misali Island, famous for coral reefs and diverse marine life that attract snorkelers and divers. The nearby Ngezi Forest Reserve offers hiking through dense forest habitat home to endemic species like the Pemba flying fox, underscoring the ecological importance of the area.

== Climate ==
Chake-Chake has a tropical climate, yet milder than Tanzania's mainland or Unguja island. The average temperature in Chake-Chake is 25.5 °C or 77.9 °F. The average annual rainfall is 1,364 millimetres or 54 inches.

Climate data for Chake-Chake
Month	Jan	Feb	Mar	Apr	May	Jun	Jul	Aug	Sep	Oct	Nov	Dec	Year
Mean daily maximum °C (°F)	30.9 (87.6)	31.6 (88.9)	31.9 (89.4)	30.1 (86.2)	28.9 (84.0)	28.5 (83.3)	27.8 (82.0)	28.1 (82.6)	28.8 (83.8)	29.7 (85.5)	30.2 (86.4)	30.8 (87.4)	29.8 (85.6)
Daily mean °C (°F)	26.8 (80.2)	27.1 (80.8)	27.4 (81.3)	26.3 (79.3)	25.3 (77.5)	24.6 (76.3)	23.7 (74.7)	23.7 (74.7)	24.1 (75.4)	25.0 (77.0)	25.9 (78.6)	26.6 (79.9)	25.5 (77.9)
Mean daily minimum °C (°F)	22.8 (73.0)	22.7 (72.9)	22.9 (73.2)	22.6 (72.7)	21.8 (71.2)	20.7 (69.3)	19.7 (67.5)	19.3 (66.7)	19.5 (67.1)	20.3 (68.5)	21.6 (70.9)	22.5 (72.5)	21.4 (70.5)
Average rainfall mm (inches)	86 (3.4)	71 (2.8)	134 (5.3)	304 (12.0)	291 (11.5)	74 (2.9)	42 (1.7)	27 (1.1)	21 (0.8)	54 (2.1)	129 (5.1)	131 (5.2)	1,364 (53.9)
Source: Climate-Data.ORG

== See also ==
- Historic Swahili Settlements

== Works cited ==
=== Books ===
- Kusimba, Chapurukha; Kusimba, Sibel, eds. (2003). East African Archaeology: Foragers, Potters, Smiths, and Traders. Penn Museum. ISBN 9781931707619.
- Lofchie, Michael (1965). Zanzibar: Background to Revolution. Princeton University Press. ISBN 9781400879540.

=== Web ===
- "2012 Population and Housing Census" (PDF). Tanzania. 2012. Archived (PDF) from the original on 24 October 2018.
- "Tanzania Building Census 2022" (PDF). Tanzania. 2022. Archived (PDF) from the original on 30 April 2025.
