= Flag of Zanzibar =

Regional flag

- Adopted: 29 January 1964; 62 years ago (original design) 9 January 2005
- Design: Horizontal tricolour of blue, black, and green with the national flag of Tanzania in the canton.
- Presidential Standard of Zanzibar
- Proportion: 3:2
- Design: A green field with a seal of the president imposed at the center.

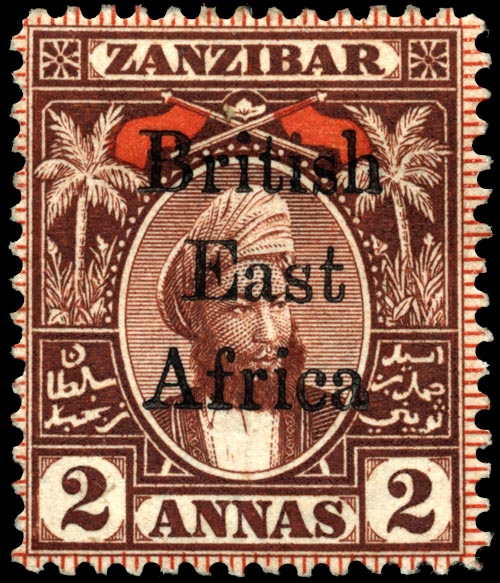
The plain red flag on an 1890s stamp

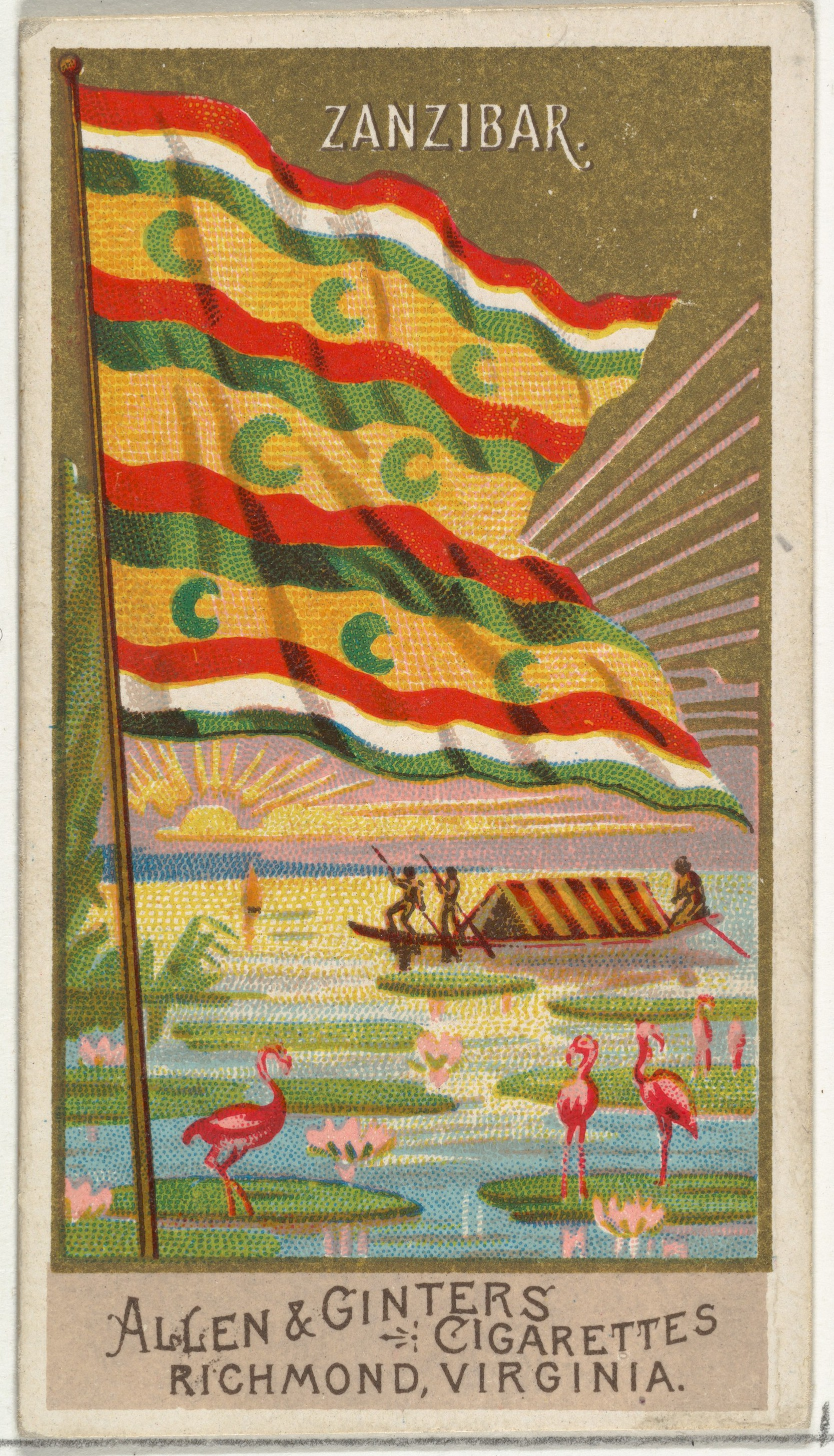
The striped 1856–96 flag on a cigarette card

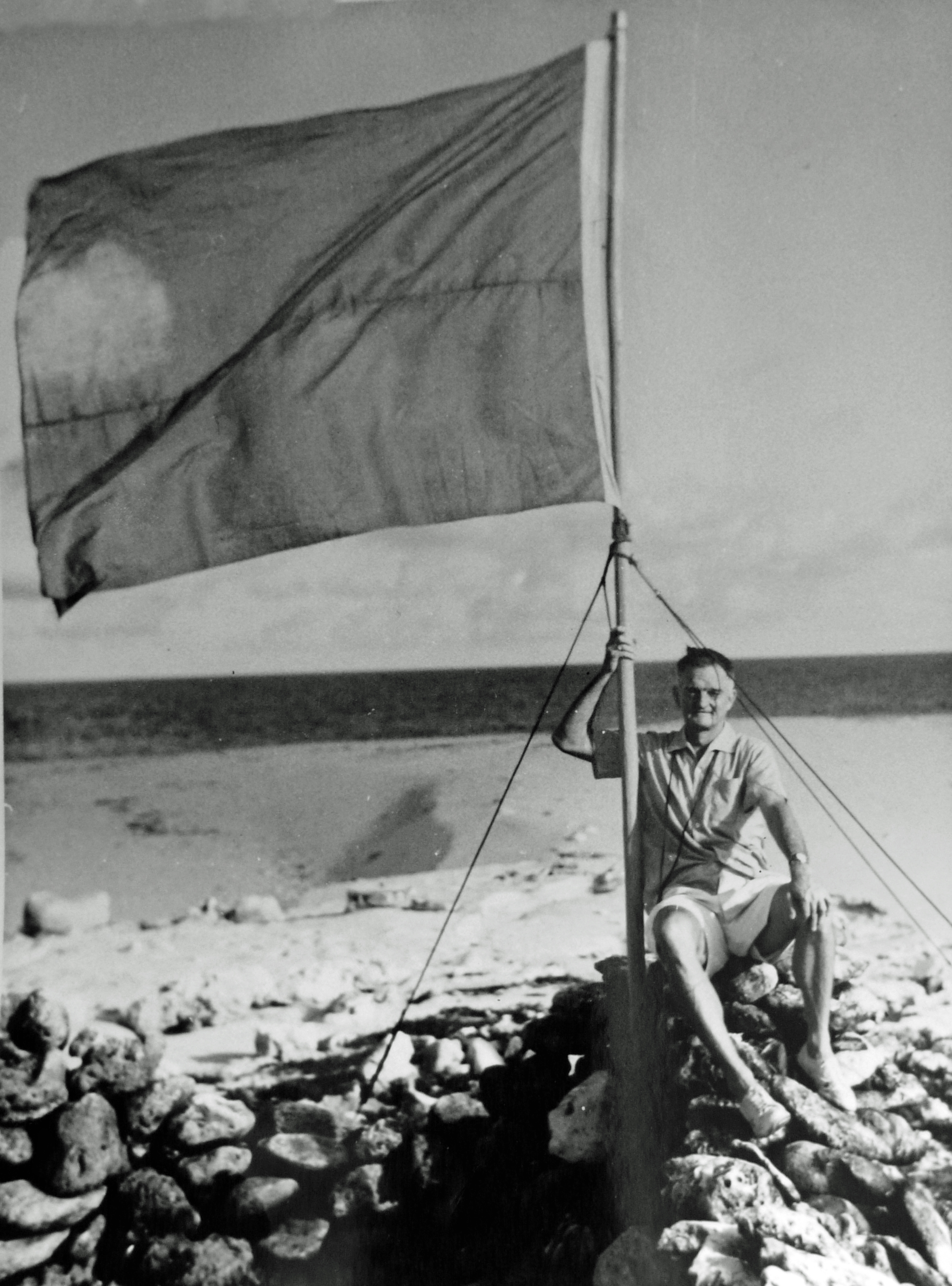
Plain red flag of the Zanzibar Sultanate being flown on Latham Island, 1964.

The flag of Zanzibar (Swahili: Bendera ya Zanzibar, Arabic: علم زنجبار) was adopted on 9 January 2005. It is a horizontal tricolour of blue, black, and green with the national flag of Tanzania in the canton.

== Historical flags ==
Zanzibar was a part of the Sultanate of Muscat and Oman, which flew a plain red flag, beginning in 1698. Majid bin Said declared an independent Sultanate of Zanzibar on 2 November 1856 but did not adopt a new flag. The red flag remained in use during the British protectorate period. When Zanzibar gained independence from the United Kingdom on 10 December 1963, a green disk with two yellow cloves was added to the flag.

On 12 January 1964, John Okello overthrew the Sultan of Zanzibar and adopted a black-yellow-blue tricolour as the flag of the People's Republic of Zanzibar. On 29 January, the country's flag was changed to a blue-black-green tricolour. This design, which was based on the flag of the Afro-Shirazi Party, was the longest-lived of the post-independence flags and eventually formed the basis for the current flag. On 26 April 1964, Zanzibar united with Tanganyika to form the new country of Tanzania and Zanzibar's old flag fell out of use.

19 October 1856 to 27 August 1896

19 October 1856 to 10 December 1963

Flag of the British Resident Minister of Zanzibar 1952–1963

10 December 1963 to 12 January 1964

12 January 1964 to 29 January 1964

29 January 1964 to 26 April 1964

Flag of the People's Republic of Pemba in use between 18 January and 7 April 1964

Flag of Afro-Shirazi Party

27 April 1964 to 8 January 2005 (Tanzania)
