= John Okello =

Ugandan revolutionary (1937–c. 1971)

- Born: John Gideon Okello; October 26, 1937; Otuke District, Uganda Protectorate
- Died: Missing required parameter 1=month! , 1971; Uganda
- Occupations: Revolutionary, political activist
- Years active: 1963–1964
- Known for: Leading the Zanzibar Revolution
- Notable work: Revolution in Zanzibar
- Title: Field Marshal of Zanzibar and Pemba

John Gideon Okello (26 October 1937 – c. 1971) was a Ugandan revolutionary and the leader of the Zanzibar Revolution in 1964. This revolution overthrew Sultan Jamshid bin Abdullah and led to the Massacre of Arabs during the Zanzibar Revolution, as well as the proclamation of Zanzibar as a republic.

== Early life ==
John Gideon Okello was born in Lango District in what was the Uganda Protectorate, and was baptized at age two, receiving the baptismal name of Gideon. He was orphaned at age 11 and grew up with relatives. When he was 15, he left and set out on his own and found work in several places within British East Africa. At various times, Okello was a clerk, manservant, gardener, and did odd-jobs as he drifted around British East Africa, living at various times in Uganda, Kenya and Tanganyika. He later went through training to become a bricklayer. He was arrested in Nairobi, Kenya on allegations of rape and was incarcerated for two years, an experience that left him with an intense Anglophobia.

In 1959, Okello left for the island of Pemba, where he tried to find work on one of the farms. Okello joined the Afro-Shirazi Party of Sheikh Abeid Karume. This party opposed the dominant position of the minority Arabs on the islands of Zanzibar and Pemba. A charismatic individual, Okello gave speeches denouncing British colonial rule, the South Asians from the Indian subcontinent who dominated the commercial life of Zanzibar and the Arabs who dominated the political life of the Sultanate. He won a following amongst the black African population on the island. In 1961, the Arab-dominated Zanzibar Nationalist Party won a rigged election, which convinced Okello that only a revolution achieved by violence would give the African majority their just political power in Zanzibar.

== Revolutionary activities ==
Okello left for Zanzibar in 1963, where he contacted the leaders of the Afro-Shirazi Youth League, the youth organisation of the Afro-Shirazi Party. The Youth League strove for a revolution in order to break the power of the Arabs. On Zanzibar, Okello was also a member of the Painters Union. As a house painter, he earned a regular salary and also had cause to move around the island, supposedly giving speeches at union branches. He used his travel to organize a grassroots revolution to overthrow the Sultan. In his free time, he built up a small army of determined African nationalists. He required its members to hold themselves to his strict rules: sexual abstinence, no raw meat, and no alcohol.

The highly religious Okello was convinced he had been given orders in his dreams by God to break the powerful position of the Arabs and to found a revolutionary state on Zanzibar and Pemba. Okello said that he had received orders from God, when still in Uganda, determining this by the position of stones in a stream. On the night before the revolution, Okello ordered his men to kill all Arabs between 18 and 25 years of age, to spare pregnant and elderly women, and not to rape virgins.

== Zanzibar uprising ==
On 12 January 1964, with popular support from the island's native African majority, Okello and his men fought their way to the capital of Zanzibar, Stone Town, where the Sultan lived. Even though they were poorly armed, Okello and his men surprised the police force of Zanzibar and they took power.

During a speech on radio, Okello dubbed himself the "Field Marshal of Zanzibar and Pemba". He gave the Sultan an order to kill his family and to kill himself afterwards; otherwise, Okello would do so himself. However, the Sultan had already brought himself to safety and would later escape to Britain. The prime minister and other ministers did not escape and were imprisoned for many years.

The coup led to the little-known bloodbath of between 2,000 and 4,000 ethnic Arabs, South Asians and Comorians, whose families had been living in Zanzibar for centuries, between 18 and 20 January. In addition to the murders, followers of Okello carried out thousands of rapes and destroyed property and homes. Within a few weeks, a fifth of the population had died or fled.

== Ousting ==
Okello created a Revolutionary Council and was named the leader of the Afro-Shirazi Party (ASP); Abeid Karume was appointed president, and the leader of the (Arabic) Umma-Massa Party, Sheik Abdulrahman Muhammad Babu Prime Minister (later, vice-president). Neither Karume nor Babu had been informed of the coup. Both resided in Tanganyika, but returned to Zanzibar, where they were welcomed by Okello. However, neither Karume nor Babu wanted anything to do with him. Afterward, Okello appeared to be too unstable to play any role in government of the new country and was quietly sidelined from the political scene by Karume, who allowed him to retain his title of Field Marshal.

By 3 February Zanzibar was finally returning to normality and Karume had been accepted, almost unquestioningly, as its president. Okello formed a paramilitary unit, known as the Freedom Military Force (FMF), from his own supporters which is known to have patrolled the streets and become involved with looting. In addition to Okello's violent rhetoric, his thick and dialectic English pronunciations and Lango tribal English accent—typical of Lango from Northern Uganda—and his Christian beliefs, alienated many in the largely moderate, Zanzibar and Muslim ASP. By March many of his FMF had been disarmed by Karume's supporters and an Umma Party militia. Okello was denied access to the country when he tried to return from a trip to the mainland, and was deported to Tanganyika, and then to Kenya before returning, destitute, to his native Uganda. He was officially removed from his post as Field Marshal on 11 March.

The People's Liberation Army (PLA) was formed by the government in April and completed the disarmament of Okello's remaining FMF troops. On 26 April, Karume announced that he had negotiated to enter into a union with Tanganyika to form the new country of Tanzania. Karume's reason for doing so may have been to prevent the radicals in the Umma Party from taking over the country or to reduce the possibility of increasing communist influence in East Africa. Despite this, many of the Umma Party's socialist policies on health, education and social welfare were adopted by the government.

== Speculations on death ==
Okello lived in Kenya, Zaire, and later returned to Uganda. He was incarcerated multiple times and was last seen with the Ugandan dictator Idi Amin in 1971; he vanished afterwards. Former diplomat Don Petterson wrote in his history Revolution in Zanzibar (2004) that most observers believed that Idi Amin saw Okello as a threat and arranged for his murder.

After Amin promoted himself, Okello reportedly joked that "now Uganda has two Field Marshals." The veracity of the joke has come under scrutiny, as it was only some years after Okello's presumed death in 1971 that Amin was promoted to Field Marshal. But Okello's status as a member of the Lango group, alongside his popularity and charisma, may have played a factor in his disappearance.

== In popular culture ==
Werner Herzog included a black slave named Okello (played by Edward Roland) in his 1972 film Aguirre, the Wrath of God. In his commentary to the 2004 DVD version of the film, Herzog says that the character of Aguirre was partly modelled on John Okello, with whom the director had been in contact. (Okello had wanted Herzog to translate a book he had written.) Herzog explains: "I chose the name Okello because I owe his craze, his hysteria, his atrocious fantasies quite a bit for this film".
