= 1963 Zanzibari general election =

General election in Zanzibar

General elections were held in the Sultanate of Zanzibar in July 1963. The number of seats was increased from 22 to 31, and the result was a victory for the Zanzibar Nationalist Party and Zanzibar and Pemba People's Party alliance, which won 18 seats, despite the fact that the Afro-Shirazi Party, which had won 13, claimed 54.2% of the vote. Voter turnout was estimated to be 99.1%.

The ZNP-ZPPP alliance, which involved the two parties not running candidates against each other in their strongholds, was invited to form a government, and led the country to independence on 10 December that year. However, on 12 January 1964, the Zanzibar Revolution brought the ASP to power.

== Results ==
Party	Votes	%	Seats	+/–
Afro-Shirazi Party	87,085	54.21	13	+3
Zanzibar Nationalist Party	47,950	29.85	12	+2
Zanzibar and Pemba People's Party	25,609	15.94	6	+3
Total	160,644	100.00	31	+8
Valid votes	160,644	98.25		
Invalid/blank votes	2,866	1.75		
Total votes	163,510	100.00		
Registered voters/turnout	165,044	99.07		
Source: African Elections Database
