= Abeid Karume =

President of Zanzibar from 1964 to 1972

Abeid Amani Karume
- عبيد أماني كرومي
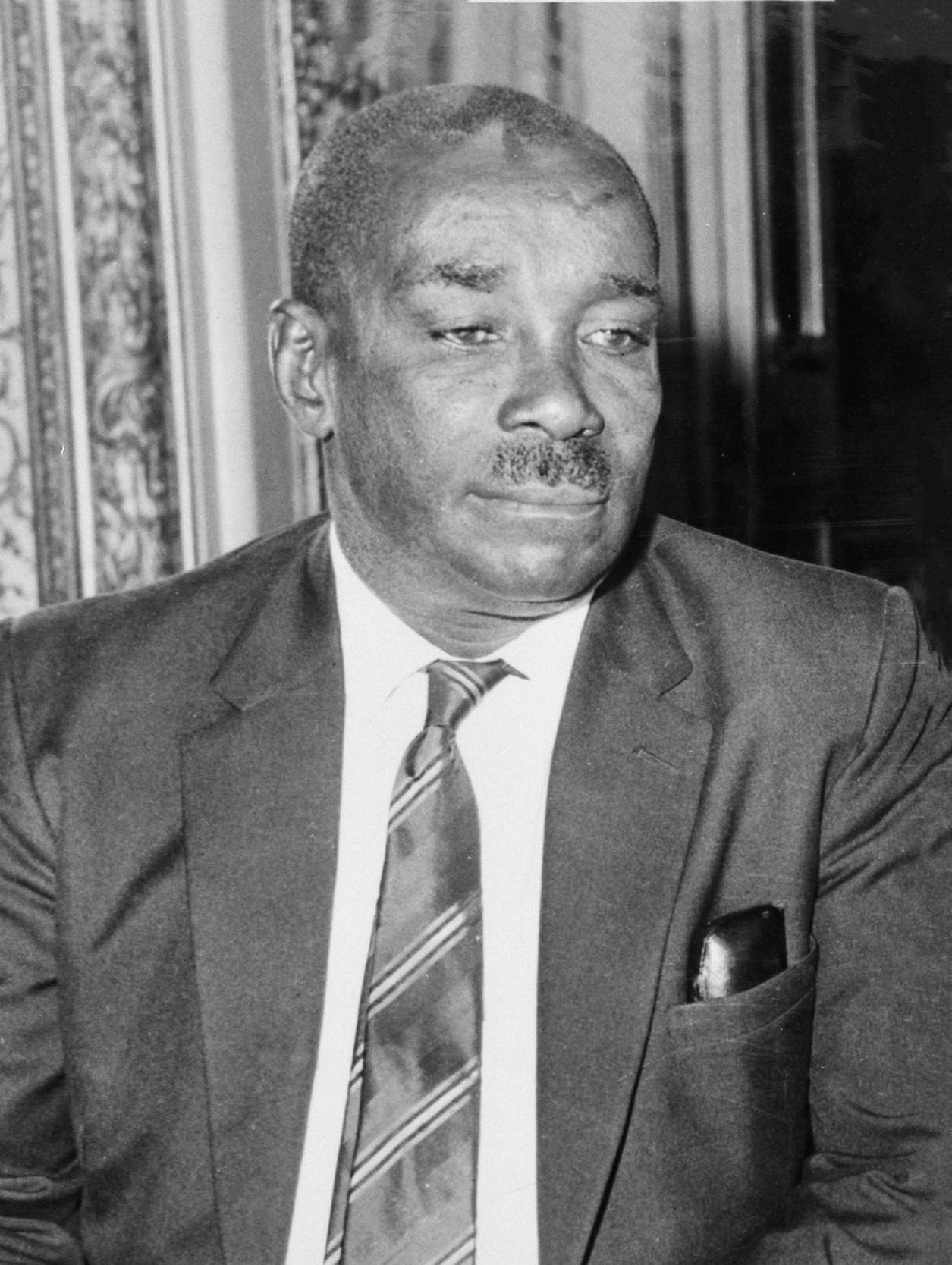
- Karume in 1964

1st President of Zanzibar
- In office 26 April 1964 – 7 April 1972
- Preceded by: Himself (as President of the People's Republic of Zanzibar and Pemba)
- Succeeded by: Aboud Jumbe

1st Vice President of Tanzania
- In office 29 October 1964 – 7 April 1972
- President: Julius Nyerere
- Preceded by: Office established
- Succeeded by: Aboud Jumbe

President of the People's Republic of Zanzibar and Pemba
- In office 12 January 1964 – 25 April 1964
- Preceded by: Jamshid bin Abdullah (as Sultan of Zanzibar)
- Succeeded by: Office abolished

Personal details
- Born: 4 August 1905 Nyasaland (now Malawi)
- Died: 7 April 1972 (aged 66) Zanzibar City, Zanzibar, Tanzania
- Cause of death: Assassination by gunshot
- Resting place: Kisiwa Nduwi, Zanzibar Town
- Party: Afro-Shirazi Party
- Spouse: Fatma Karume
- Children: Amani; Ali

Abeid Amani Karume (4 August 1905 – 7 April 1972) was a Tanzanian politician and statesman who served as the first president of Zanzibar and vice-president of Tanzania from 1964 until his assassination in 1972.

He obtained the title of president as a result of a revolution which led to the deposing of Jamshid bin Abdullah, the last reigning Sultan of Zanzibar, in January 1964. Three months later, Zanzibar united with Tanganyika and formed Tanzania, and Karume became the first vice-president with Julius Nyerere (the then president of Tanganyika) as president of the new unified country. He was the father of Zanzibar's sixth president, Amani Abeid Karume.

== Early life and career ==
Abeid Karume was born on 4 August 1905. However, his birthplace is disputed with reports stating that he was born in Nyasaland (present-day Malawi), while others stated that he was allegedly born in the village of Mwera in Zanzibar.

Nevertheless, Karume had little formal education and worked as a seaman before entering politics. He once proudly served as an oarsman for the Sultan's ceremonial barge. He left Zanzibar in the early years of his life, travelling among other places to London, where he gained an understanding of geopolitics and international affairs through exposure to African thinkers such as Hastings Banda of Malawi. Karume developed an apparatus of control through the expansion of the Afro-Shirazi Party (ASP) and its relations with the Tanganyika African National Union (TANU) party.

== Revolution in Zanzibar ==
On 10 December 1963, the United Kingdom granted full independence to Zanzibar after the Zanzibar National Party (ZNP) and Zanzibar and Pemba People's Party won the elections. The Sultan was a constitutional monarch. Initial elections gave government control to the ZNP. Karume was willing to work within the electoral framework of the new government, and actually informed a British police officer of the revolutionary plot set to take place in January.

Karume was not in Zanzibar on 12 January 1964, the night of the revolution, and was instead on the African mainland. The instigator of the rebellion was a previously unknown Ugandan, John Okello. 2,000 - 4,000 Zanzibaris, mostly Zanzibari Arabs and Indians, were murdered, with relatively few casualties on the revolutionary side. Many more were raped and images of mass-killings and mass-graves invocative of genocidal episodes were published in the world media causing immediate alarm and embarrassing the Nyerere Government. The Zanzibar Revolution brought an end to about 500 years of Arab domination on the island during which the Arab Slave Trade, most significantly, had resulted in a strong resentment among the majority African population.

== Power struggle ==
Having taken control of the island, John Okello invited Abeid Karume back to the island to assume the title of President of the People's Republic of Zanzibar. Other Zanzibaris in foreign territory were also invited back, most notably the Marxist politician Abdulrahman Mohammad Babu, who was appointed to the Revolutionary Council. John Okello reserved for himself the title of "Field Marshal", a position with undefined power. What followed was a three-month-long internal struggle for power.

Karume used his political skills to align the leaders of neighboring African countries against Okello and invited Tanganyikan police officers into Zanzibar to maintain order. As soon as Okello took a trip out of the country, Karume declared him an "enemy of the state" and did not allow him to return. Given the presence of Tanganyikan police and the absence of their leader, Okello's gangs of followers did not offer any resistance.

Karume's second important political move came when he agreed with the Tanganyikan president Julius Nyerere in April 1964 that Zanzibar would form a union with Tanganyika. As a result, Karume was rewarded with the post of First Vice-President. The union ensured that the new country, to be called Tanzania, would not align itself with the Soviet Union and communist bloc, as A.M. Babu had advocated. Given the new legitimacy of Karume's government (now solidly backed up by mainland Tanganyika), Karume marginalized Babu to the point of irrelevance. The Marxist leader was eventually forced to flee Tanzania after being charged with masterminding the assassination of Karume in 1972.

== Personal life ==
In 1970, four young Persian girls refused to marry the 64-year old Karume. As a result, he ordered the arrest of 10 of their male relatives for "hindering the implementation of mixed marriages." He threatened to deport these men and dozens of other members of the Twelver Shiite sect of which they belonged. Because of Tanzanian President Nyerere's pressure, Karume eventually dropped the charges. However, a few months later, the 4 different Persian girls were forced to marry members of his Revolutionary Council and 11 of the girls' relatives afterwards were ordered by a judge to be imprisoned and flogged.

Karume remarked on the situation: "In colonial times the Arabs took African concubines without bothering to marry them. Now that we are in power, the shoe is on the other foot."

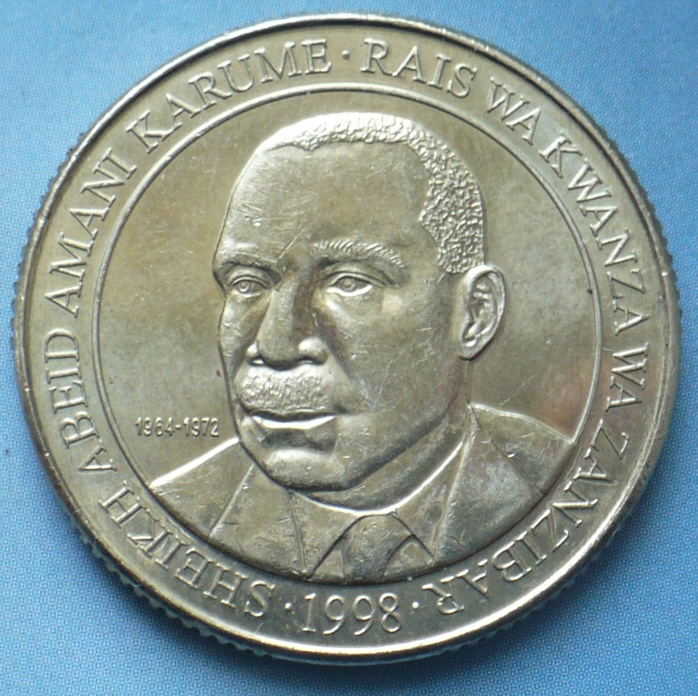
Karume on Tanzania 200 shillings

== Assassination and legacy ==
On 7 April 1972, four gunmen shot Karume to death as he played bao at the headquarters of the Afro-Shirazi Party in Zanzibar Town. Reprisals followed against people suspected to have been opposed to Karume's regime. During his tenure he was able to nationalize land owned by Arabs and Indians and re-distribute the land among the poor majority Zanzibaris. He also established a system of free education and health services for all Zanzibaris regardless of their race, color or ethnicity. Apart from that, he engaged in construction of many houses available to the people of Zanzibar at very affordable rents. Amani Abeid Karume, Abeid's son, was elected two times as the president of Zanzibar, in 2000 and 2005 by a popular majority and handed over power in late 2010 to his successor Ali Mohamed Shein. His death date, 7 April, has since been a public holiday.

== See also ==
- Njenga Karume
- Godfrey Mwakikagile

Political offices
New title Jamshid bin Abdullah of Zanzibar as Sultan of Zanzibar	President of Zanzibar; 1964–1972	Succeeded by Aboud Jumbe
New title	Vice President of Tanzania; 1964–1972	Succeeded by Aboud Jumbe
