= Abdulrahman Mohamed Babu =

Tanzanian politician

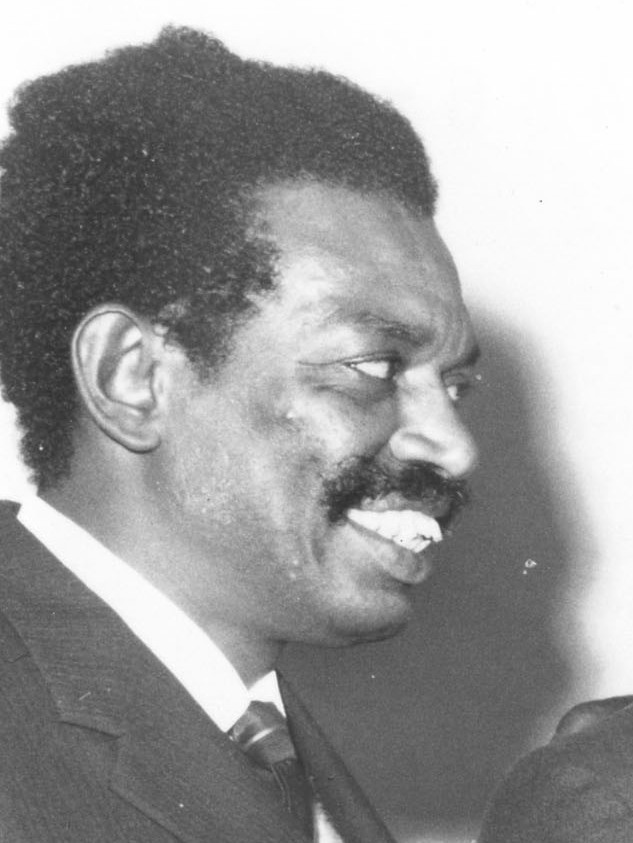
- Babu in 1966
- Born: 22 September 1924; Sultanate of Zanzibar
- Died: 5 August 1996 (aged 71); London, England
- Occupations: Pan-Africanist nationalist and politician
- Notable work: Socialist Africa or African Socialism (1981)

Abdulrahman Mohamed Babu (22 September 1924 – 5 August 1996) was a Zanzibar-born Marxist and pan-Africanist nationalist who played an important role in the 1964 Zanzibar Revolution and served as a minister under Julius Nyerere after the island was merged with mainland Tanganyika to form Tanzania. He was jailed by Nyerere from 1972 and, after his release following an international campaign, remained a vocal critic of imperialism, authoritarian states and excessively statist (as well as private capitalist) development models.

== Early years ==
Abdulrahman Mohamed Babu was born in September 1924 in Zanzibar, East Africa – then a British protectorate, under the nominal control of the hereditary Sultan. The island's economy was centred on exporting cloves and coconuts, and its population included Arabs, Africans and Indians. After serving in the British forces during World War II, and a stint as a clerk on a clove plantation, he studied in Britain from 1951, where he was drawn first to anarchist-communism and then to Marxism-Leninism.

== Anti-colonialism ==
Influenced by the rise of anti-colonial movements and impressed by the rising power of the Union of Soviet Socialist Republics, Babu threw himself into the independence movement. He was the leader of the first mass nationalist party on the island, the Zanzibar Nationalist Party (ZNP), and in 1958 attended the All-African Peoples' Conference in Accra, Ghana, where he met Kwame Nkrumah, Frantz Fanon and Patrice Lumumba, following which Babu visited Mao Zedong's China in 1959. Babu had built close relations with the Chinese leadership and was viewed by the British as "the best known Sinophile" in the area.

Babu was jailed for two years by the British. At independence in 1962, government was transferred to a coalition, drawn from the right wing of the ZNP and a splinter off the moderate Afro-Shirazi Party of Abeid Karume, which retained the Sultan as constitutional monarch. The ZNP left-wing, including Babu, quit to form the revolutionary Umma Party, which built a popular base across race lines.

== The Zanzibar Revolution, 1964 ==
In early 1964, massive riots broke out, and the Umma Party played a key role, notable for having "prevented the revolution from taking a racial character i.e. African against Arab". This played a political face-saving measure for the Nyerere government which was horrified with the scenes of mass killings and open-pit mass graves. The principle provocateur of the revolution, the African Nationalist John Okello, had specifically demanded the killing of all Arabs between the ages of 18 and 25. The Revolution led to the deaths of up to 20,000, mainly Arabs, with widespread rape and some settlements completely wiped out. Following the state capture of Zanzibar, racially motivated violence and persecution continued, forcing up to 75% of Arabs, Asians and Comoros Islanders to leave their centuries-old ancestral home.

A new government was formed by the Afro-Shirazi Party and the Umma Party, with Abeid Karume as President and Babu the Foreign Minister, comprising the Zanzibar Revolutionary Council. Pressured by Britain, Karume pushed through a merger between Zanzibar and Tanganyika in April 1964, although this had little support in his government or the people. Babu was among the progressive, leftist members of the Zanzibari government who was retained in the new joint Cabinet Dar es Salaam. His connections to China continued, and his ideological affinity and work with the New China News Agency made him a good channel of communication with Beijing. Meanwhile he met – in July 1964 at the second summit of the Organization of African Unity (OAU) in Cairo, Egypt – and became friends with, as well as arguably influencing, Malcolm X.

== After Union ==
This also enabled Babu to a key role to play in the establishment of the TAZARA Railway with the help of Chinese aid. Julius Nyerere wanted to build on Zanzibar's close ties with China and create benefits for the whole country. Babu was named head of the trade delegation that preceded Nyerere’s presidential delegation to China in 1964. Due to his personal experience with the Chinese and his ideological affinity for their Marxist-Leninist model of development, Babu seized the initiative and mentioned the difficulties his government faced in trying to secure financing for the TAZARA Railway. On 1 July 1965 the Chinese Government made a firm offer of tied aid to the governments of Tanzania and Zambia, worth £75 million and £150 million to enable them to build the railway line. Another outcome of his trip was a trade agreement (separate from the £11 million aid agreement) for £5 million a year for five years. Under this agreement the Tanzanians were to buy whatever they could afford from the Chinese but the Chinese were to buy £5 million worth a year from Tanzania. The Chinese would pay cash for the balance not taken up by purchases from Tanzania.

== Jail ==
Babu rejected Nyerere's model of African socialism for failing to address Tanzania's reliance on raw material exports, a colonial legacy; for replicating, in its rural policies, fairly orthodox policies under the guise of 'Ujamaa' radicalism; and for irresponsible and unsustainable nationalization especially of small businesses, often owned by the Indian minority. Since the key task was to develop the forces of production in such a way as to end neo-colonial patterns, dislocating production, failing to provide funding to villagers, and aiming at a "fairer" integration into world capitalism, as Nyerere did, would not be successful.

In 1972, Karume was assassinated, and Babu along with 40 other Umma Party members were jailed for alleged involvement, despite a lack of evidence, leading to death sentences three years later, but were finally released after an international campaign. Babu and 12 other prisoners held on the mainland were freed by Nyerere in an amnesty.

== Development model and the "Letter to Mugabe" ==
In his well-known book Socialist Africa or African Socialism, which was written in prison, and in work after his release, Babu stressed the importance of fundamental economic change. Internal change in the country, rather than changes in the global environment, were key, and this required careful management of contradictions among the people, including the national bourgeoisie, as advised by Mao Zedong.

In his 1980 Open Letter to Robert Mugabe in 1980, he argued that experience showed that 'the taking over of ongoing viable farms' by states 'has invariably led to almost total collapse of agricultural production and has forced the countries concerned to incur heavy foreign debt to import food'. He argued that the state should promote cooperative as opposed to peasant farms alongside the large white-owned commercial farms, obliging the latter to support the former, and split the more progressive white farmers from the "reactionaries". Rising rural incomes would boost the home market which would boost industrialization.

He also spoke out repeatedly against authoritarian postcolonial states, and argued in favour of genuine democracy, which he saw as antithetical to capitalism and imperialism. He wished for a 'socialist and united Africa'.

== Last years ==
For most of the years after his release by Nyerere, Babu lived in the United States of America or Britain, but remained involved in African politics, including efforts to forge an alternative to neo-liberalism. He stayed in London for years as a scholar. However, he returned to Tanzania in 1995 to stand as a candidate for the NCCR-Mageuzi party, a mixed formation that was running in the first multi-party elections in decades Legal manipulations preventing him running as a candidate, and the elections were not free or fair; the incumbent party was re-elected. The old charges against and consequent conviction of Babu allowed the Electoral Commission to rejecting his bid to run for the vice-presidency.

Babu died aged 72 on August 5, 1996, at the London Chest Hospital after a short illness.

== Positions held ==
- Chair - Africa Centre (London) (1985–89)
- Foreign Minister of Zanzibar (January 1964 – April 1964)
- Founder - Umma Party (Zanzibar) (1963)
- Secretary General - Zanzibar Nationalist Party (1957–63)
- Minister of Economic Planning (1964–1972)
- Picked as the presidential running-mate for the NCCR-Mageuzi ticket in the 1995 elections.

== Publications ==
- Babu, A. M., 1981, African Socialism or Socialist Africa?, London: Zed Press.
- Babu, Salma, and Amrit Wilson (eds), 2002, The Future That Works: Selected Writings of A.M.Babu. New Jersey: Africa World Press.
