= Muhammad Shamte Hamadi =

Head of government of Zanzibar from 1961 to 1964

Prime Minister of Zanzibar
- In office 24 June 1963 – 12 January 1964
- Monarch: Jamshid
- Preceded by: Himself as Chief Minister
- Succeeded by: Abdullah Kassim Hanga (People's Republic)

Chief Minister of Zanzibar
- In office 5 June 1961 – 24 June 1963
- Monarch: Abdullah
- Preceded by: Geoffrey Charles Lawrence
- Succeeded by: Himself as Prime Minister

Personal details
- Born: 7 January 1907
- Died: 1984 United Arab Emirates
- Party: ZNP

Muhammad Shamte Hamadi (7 January 1907 – 1984) was Chief Minister of Sultanate of Zanzibar from 5 June 1961 to 24 June 1963 and the only prime minister in its history from 24 June to 12 January 1964.
