= Zanzibar Revolution =

1964 overthrow of the Sultan of Zanzibar

- Part of the Cold War
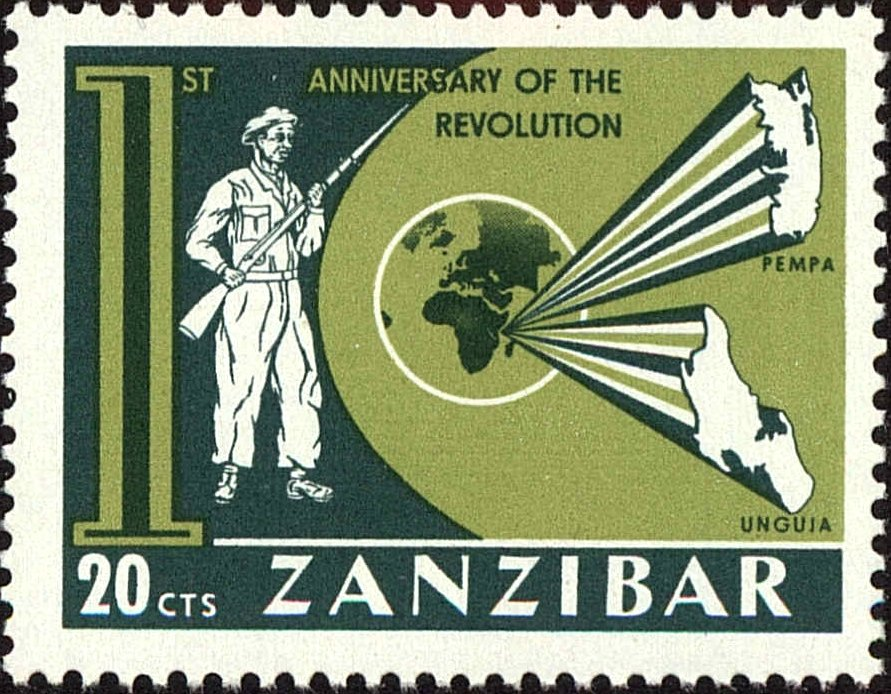
- 1965 Zanzibar stamp commemorating the revolution
Date	12 January 1964
Location	Zanzibar 06°09′36″S 39°11′26″E
Result	Revolutionary victory

Belligerents
(Zanzibar) Revolutionaries; Afro-Shirazi Party; Umma Party	Sultanate of Zanzibar

Commanders and leaders
(Zanzibar) John Okello	(Sultanate of Zanzibar) Sultan Jamshid bin Abdullah (Sultanate of Zanzibar) Muhammad Shamte Hamadi

Strength
600–800 men	Zanzibar Police Force

Casualties and losses
- At least 80 killed and 200 injured during revolution (the majority were Arabs) up to 4,000 civilians killed in the aftermath
- Location within Tanzania

The Zanzibar Revolution (Swahili: Mapinduzi ya Zanzibar; Arabic: ثورة زنجبار, romanized: Thawrat Zanjibār) began on 12 January 1964 and led to the overthrow of the Sultan of Zanzibar Jamshid bin Abdullah and his mainly Arab government by the island's majority Black African population.

Zanzibar was an ethnically diverse state consisting of a number of islands off the east coast of Tanganyika. Formally separated from German East Africa in 1890, it had become fully independent in 1963, with responsibility for its own defense and foreign affairs, as a result of Britain giving up its protectorate over it. In a series of parliamentary elections preceding this change, the Arab minority succeeded in retaining the hold on power it had inherited from Zanzibar's former history as an overseas territory of Oman.

Frustrated by the lack of parliamentary representation compared to its share of votes in the July 1963 election, the African Afro-Shirazi Party (ASP), led by John Okello, mobilised around 600–800 men on the main island of Unguja on the morning of 12 January 1964. Having overrun the country's police force and appropriated their weaponry, the insurgents proceeded to Zanzibar Town, where they overthrew the Sultan and his government.

The insurgents conducted a massacre of Arabs, looting Arab and South Asian–owned properties and businesses, and raping or murdering Arab and Indian civilians on the island. The death toll is disputed, with estimates ranging from several hundred to 20,000. An estimated 10,000 people escaped from the island, with many fleeing to the UK. Around a quarter of Zanzibar's Arabs were killed in the massacres. The moderate ASP leader Abeid Karume became the country's new president and head of state.

The new government's apparent communist ties concerned Western governments. As Zanzibar lay within the British sphere of influence, the British government drew up a number of intervention plans. However, the feared communist government never materialised. Because British and American citizens were successfully evacuated, the UK did not intervene in the island's unrest. The Eastern Bloc powers of East Germany and the Soviet Union, along with the anti-Soviet People's Republic of China, immediately recognised the new government and sent advisors.

Karume succeeded in negotiating a merger of Zanzibar with Tanganyika to form the new nation of Tanzania. Contemporary media assessed this merger as an attempt to prevent communist subversion of Zanzibar. The revolution ended more than 250 years of Arab dominance in Zanzibar. It is commemorated on the island each year with anniversary celebrations and a public holiday. The toll of victims in the massacres is generally not recognized.

== Background ==
The Zanzibar Archipelago, now part of the Southeast African republic of Tanzania, is a group of islands lying in the Indian Ocean off the coast of Tanganyika. It comprises the main southern island of Unguja (also known as Zanzibar), the smaller northern island of Pemba, and numerous surrounding islets. Merchants and traders regularly visited the islands from Persia, Arabia, and India, beginning around the millennium. Some settled there, and Islam became influential in island culture among all ethnicities.

The long history of Arab rule dated to 1698, and Zanzibar was an overseas territory of Oman until it achieved independence in 1858 under its own Sultanate. In 1890 during Ali ibn Sa'id's reign, Zanzibar became a British protectorate after the Heligoland–Zanzibar Treaty separated British and German territory in Central Africa during the Scramble for Africa. Although never under direct British rule, it was considered part of the British Empire.

By 1964, the country was a constitutional monarchy ruled by Sultan Jamshid bin Abdullah. Zanzibar had a population of around 230,000 Africans—some of whom claimed Persian ancestry and were known locally as Shirazis—and also contained significant minorities of 50,000 Arabs and 20,000 South Asians, who had long been prominent in business and trade. The various ethnic groups were becoming mixed by intermariage and the distinctions among them had blurred; according to one historian, an important reason for the general support for Sultan Jamshid was his family's ethnic diversity.

But the island's Arab inhabitants were the major landowners, and were generally wealthier than the Africans. They enjoyed access to higher quality social services, such as health and education, than Africans. Apart from that, British authority considered Zanzibar as an Arab country and always held a position of supporting the Arab minority to stay in power.

With the approach of the withdrawal of the British in the early 1960s, the major political parties organised largely along ethnic lines, with Arabs dominating the Zanzibar Nationalist Party (ZNP) and Africans the Afro-Shirazi Party (ASP). The ZNP looked towards Egypt as its model, which caused some tensions with the British officials on the islands. On the other hand, for centuries Zanzibar had been dominated by its Arab ruling class, and the Colonial Office could not imagine a Zanzibar ruled by black Africans.

In January 1961, as part of the process of British withdrawal from the islands, the island's authorities drew up constituencies and held democratic elections. The ASP and the ZNP each won 11 of the available 22 seats in Zanzibar's Parliament, so further elections were held in June, with the number of seats increased to 23. The ZNP entered into a coalition with the Zanzibar and Pemba People's Party (ZPPP) and this time took 13 seats, while the ASP, despite receiving the most votes, won 10. Electoral fraud was suspected by the ASP, and civil disorder broke out, resulting in 68 deaths. To maintain control, the coalition government banned the more radical opposition parties, filled the civil service with its own appointees, and politicised the police.

In 1963, with the number of parliamentary seats increased to 31, another election saw a repeat of the 1961 votes, along with bitterly divisive propagandaizing. Due to the layout of the constituencies, which were gerrymandered by the ZNP, the ASP, led by Abeid Amani Karume, won 54 percent of the popular vote but only 13 seats. The ZNP/ZPPP won the rest and set about strengthening its hold on power. The Umma Party, formed that year by disaffected radical Arab socialist supporters of the ZNP, was banned, and all policemen of African mainland origin were dismissed.

This removed a large portion of the only security force on the island, and created an angry group of paramilitary-trained men with knowledge of police buildings, equipment and procedures. The new Arab-dominated government made it clear that in foreign policy, the Sultanate of Zanzibar would be seeking close links with the Arab world, especially Egypt, and had no interest in forging relationships with the nations on the African mainland, as the black majority wished.

Slavery in Zanzibar had been abolished in 1897, but much of the Arab elite who dominated the island's politics made little effort to hide their racist views of the black majority as their inferiors, a people fit only for slavery. In Parliament, the Minister of Finance Juma Aley responded to questions from Karume by insultingly saying he need not answer questions from a mere "boatman". Aley said in another speech in Parliament that if Arabs were over-represented in the Cabinet, it was not because of race, but rather it was because the mental abilities of blacks were so abysmally low and the mental abilities of Arabs like himself were so high, a remark that enraged the black majority.

Memories of centuries of Arab slave-trading in the past (some of the older black people had been slaves in their youth), together with the distinctly patronizing view of the Arab elite towards the black majority in the present, meant that much of the black population of Zanzibar had a ferocious hatred of the Arabs, and viewed the new Arab-dominated government as illegitimate. The government drastically cut spending in schools in areas with high concentrations of black people, which heightened tensions. The government's budget, with its draconian spending cuts in schools in black areas, was widely seen as a sign that the Arab-dominated government was planning to lock the black people in a permanent second-class status.

On 10 December 1963, with the termination of the British protectorate, complete independence was achieved, with the ZNP/ZPPP coalition as the government. The government requested a defence agreement from the United Kingdom, asking for a battalion of British troops to be stationed on the island for internal security duties, but this request was rejected. The UK believed it inappropriate for British troops to be involved in maintenance of law and order so soon after complete independence. And in any event many of the cabinet, who were seeking closer ties with Egypt, ruled by the radical, anti-Western nationalist Nasser, did not want British troops in Zanzibar. British intelligence reports predicted that a civil disturbance, accompanied by increasing communist activity, was likely in the near future, and that the arrival of British troops might cause the situation to deteriorate further. Many foreign nationals remained on the island, including 130 Britons who were direct employees of the Zanzibar government.

In 1959, a charismatic Ugandan named John Okello arrived in Pemba, working as a bricklayer. In February 1963 he moved to Zanzibar. Working as an official in the Zanzibar and Pemba Paint Workers' Union and as an activist of the ASP, Okello had built a following and, almost from the moment when he arrived on Zanzibar, had been organizing a revolution that he planned to take place shortly after independence.

== Revolution ==
Around 3:00 am on 12 January 1964, 600–800 poorly armed, mainly African insurgents, aided by some of the recently dismissed ex-policemen, attacked Unguja's police stations to seize weapons, and then the radio station. The attackers had no guns, being equipped only with spears, knives, machetes, and tire irons, but they had the advantage of numbers and surprise. The Arab police replacements had received almost no training and, despite responding with a mobile force, were soon overcome. Okello himself led the attack on the Ziwani police HQ, the largest armory on the island. Several of the rebels were fatally shot, but the police were overwhelmed by sheer numbers.

Okello personally attacked a police sentry, wrestled his rifle from him, and used it to bayonet the policeman to death. Arming themselves with hundreds of captured automatic rifles, submachine guns and Bren guns, the insurgents took control of strategic buildings in the capital, Zanzibar Town. At about 7:00 am, Okello made his first radio broadcast from a local radio station his followers had captured two hours earlier, calling upon the Africans to rise up and overthrow the "imperialists". At the time, Okello referred to himself only as "the field marshal". There was much speculation on Zanzibar about the identity of this mysterious figure leading the revolution, who spoke Swahili with a thick Ugandan Acholi accent that was unfamiliar on Zanzibar.

Within six hours of the outbreak of hostilities, the town's telegraph office and main government buildings were under revolutionary control, and the island's only airstrip was captured at 2:18 pm. In the countryside, fighting had erupted between the Manga, as the rural Arabs were called, and the Africans. The Manga were armed mainly with hunting rifles, and once the arms seized from the police stations reached the rebels in the countryside, the Manga were doomed. It is claimed by an American diplomat Don Petterson, living then in Zanzibar, that the fiercest resistance was at the Malindi police station, where under the command of Police Commissioner J. M. Sullivan (a British policeman who stayed on until a local replacement could be hired), all of the rebel attacks were repulsed, not least because the insurgents tended to retreat whenever they came under fire. Sullivan did not surrender the Malindi station until late in the afternoon and only after running out of ammunition. As claimed by Sullivan, he marched his entire force (not one policeman had been killed or wounded) down to the Stone Town wharf to board some boats that took them out to a ship, the Salama, to take them away from Zanzibar.

Throughout Stone Town, rebels had looted and destroyed shops and homes owned by Arabs and South Asians, and gang-raped numerous Arab and South Asian women. The Sultan, together with Prime Minister Muhammad Shamte Hamadi and members of the cabinet, fled the island on the royal yacht Seyyid Khalifa. The revolutionary government seized the Sultan's palace and other property. At least 80 people were killed and 200 injured, the majority of whom were Arabs, during the 12 hours of street fighting that followed.

Sixty-one American citizens, including 16 men staffing a NASA satellite tracking station, sought sanctuary in the English Club in Zanzibar Town, and four US journalists were detained by the island's new government.

Not knowing that Okello had given orders to kill no whites, the Americans living in Stone Town fled to the English Club, the point for evacuation. Those travelling in the car convoy to the English Club were shocked to see the battered bodies of Arab men lying out on the streets of Stone Town with their severed penises and testicles shoved into their mouths. As part of Okello's carefully laid out plans, all over the island, gangs of Africans armed with knives, spears and pangas (machetes) went about systematically killing all the Arabs and South Asians they could find. The American diplomat Don Petterson described this horror as he watched from his house a gang of African men storm the house of an Arab man, behead him in public with a panga, followed by screams from within his house as his wife and three children were raped and killed, followed by the same scene being repeated at the next house of an Arab, followed by yet another and another. After taking control of Stone Town on the first day, the revolutionaries continued to fight the Manga for control of the countryside for at least two days afterwards; whole families of Arabs were massacred after their homes had been stormed.

According to the official Zanzibari history, the revolution was planned and headed by the ASP leader Abeid Amani Karume. But, at the time Karume was on the African mainland, as was the leader of the banned Umma Party, Abdulrahman Muhammad Babu.

Okello, in his capacity as the ASP youth branch secretary for Pemba, had sent Karume to the mainland to ensure his safety. Okello had arrived in Zanzibar from Kenya in 1959, claiming to have been a field marshal for the Kenyan rebels during the Mau Mau uprising. He did not have any military experience. He maintained that he heard a voice commanding him, as a Christian, to free the Zanzibari people from the Muslim Arabs, but the Zanzibaris were predominantly Muslim. Okello led the revolutionaries—mainly unemployed members of the Afro-Shirazi Youth League—on 12 January. One commentator has speculated that it was probably Okello, with the Youth League, who planned the revolution. There appear to have been three different plots to overthrow the government, led by Karume, Babu and Okello, but it was Okello's plan that was furthest advanced and he struck the blow that brought down the Sultan's regime. Okello was not widely known in Zanzibar, and the government was more concerned with monitoring the ASP and Umma rather than a little-known and barely literate house painter and minor union official. Okello was a complete mystery to the world at the time of the revolution. MI5 reported to Whitehall that he was an ex-policeman who fought with the Mau Mau in Kenya and had been trained in Cuba in the art of revolutionary violence. At a press conference several days later, Okello angrily denied ever having been to Cuba or China. He said he was a Christian and believed "Everything can be learned from the Bible".

During the revolution, Africans committed an orgy of violence against the South Asian and Arab communities, including thousands of women being raped by Okello's followers, and extensive looting and massacres of Arabs all over the island. The American diplomat Don Petterson described the killings of Arabs by the African majority as an act of genocide. Petterson wrote "Genocide was not a term that was as much in vogue then, as it came to be later, but it is fair to say that in parts of Zanzibar, the killing of Arabs was genocide, pure and simple".

Okello frequently took to the radio to urge his followers in thunderous Old Testament language to kill as many Arabs as possible, with the maximum of brutality. As a Pan-African nationalist who made his followers sing "God Bless Africa" whenever he marched through the streets, Okello appealed to the black majority. But as a militant Christian who claimed to hear the voice of God in his head, Okello had lesser appeal to the island's population that was 95 per cent Muslim.

== Aftermath ==
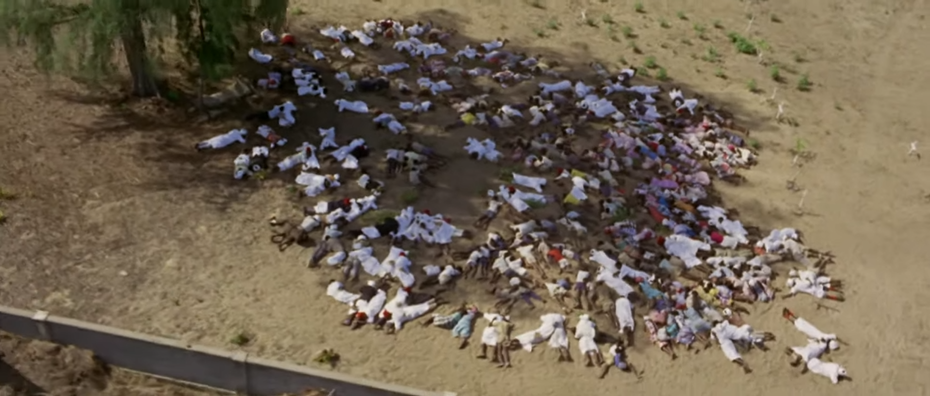
The bodies of Arabs killed in the post-revolution violence as photographed by the Africa Addio film crew in 1964

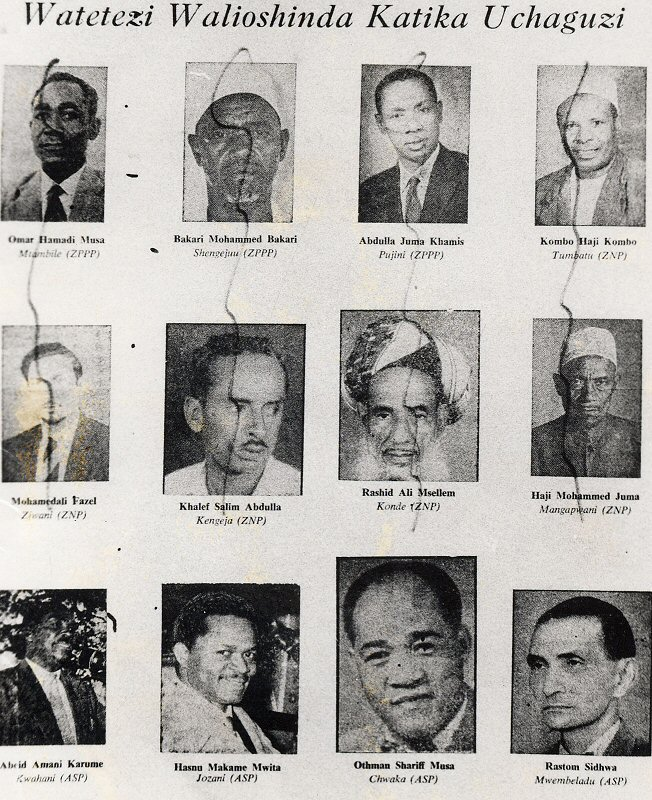
Paper shows photos of ex-government officials defaced after the revolution.

A Revolutionary Council was established by the ASP and Umma parties to act as an interim government, with Karume heading the council as President and Babu serving as the Minister of External Affairs. The country was renamed the People's Republic of Zanzibar and Pemba; the new government's first acts were to permanently banish the Sultan and to ban the ZNP and ZPPP. Seeking to distance himself from the volatile Okello, Karume quietly sidelined him from the political scene, although allowing him to retain his self-bestowed title of field marshal. But Okello's revolutionaries soon began reprisals against the Arab and Asian population of Unguja, carrying out beatings, rapes, murders, and attacks on property. Okello claimed in radio speeches to have killed or imprisoned tens of thousands of his "enemies and stooges", but estimates of the number of deaths vary greatly, from "hundreds" to 20,000. Some Western newspapers give figures of 2,000 to 4,000; however, the higher numbers may be inflated by Okello's own broadcasts and exaggerated reports in some Western and Arab news media. The killing of Arab prisoners and their burial in mass graves was documented by an Italian film crew, filming from a helicopter, for Africa Addio and this sequence of film comprises the only known visual document of the killings. Many Arabs fled to safety in Oman, with others becoming refugees in the UK. By Okello's order no Europeans were harmed. The post-revolution violence did not spread to Pemba.

By 3 February Zanzibar was finally returning to normality, and Karume had been widely accepted by the people as their president. A police presence was back on the streets, looted shops were re-opening, and unlicensed arms were being surrendered by the civilian populace. The revolutionary government announced that its political prisoners, numbering 500, would be tried by special courts. Okello formed the Freedom Military Force (FMF), a paramilitary unit made up of his supporters, which patrolled the streets and looted Arab property. The behaviour of Okello's supporters, his violent rhetoric, Ugandan accent, and Christian beliefs were alienating many in the largely moderate Zanzibari and Muslim ASP. By March many members of his FMF had been disarmed by Karume's supporters and the Umma Party militia.

On 11 March Okello was officially stripped of his rank of Field Marshal, and was denied entry when trying to return to Zanzibar from a trip to the mainland. He was deported to Tanganyika and then to Kenya, before returning destitute to his native Uganda.

In April the government formed the People's Liberation Army (PLA) and completed the disarmament of Okello's remaining FMF militia. On 26 April Karume announced that a union had been negotiated with Tanganyika to form the new country of Tanzania. The merger was seen by contemporary media as a means of preventing communist subversion of Zanzibar; at least one historian states that it may have been an attempt by Karume, a moderate socialist, to limit the influence of the radically left-wing Umma Party. Babu had become close to Chinese diplomats who had arranged for several shipments of arms to be sent to Zanzibar to allow the Umma Party to have a paramilitary wing.

Both Karume and President Nyerere of Tanganyika were concerned that Zanzibar was starting to become a hot-spot of Cold War tensions as American and British diplomats competed for influence with Soviet, Chinese and East German diplomats. They believed that a union with the non-aligned Tanganyika was the best way to remove Zanzibar from the world spotlight. Many of the Umma Party's socialist policies on health, education and social welfare were adopted by the government.

== Foreign reaction ==
British military forces in Kenya were made aware of the revolution at 4:45 am on 12 January, and following a request from the Sultan were put on 15 minutes' standby to conduct an assault on Zanzibar's airfield. However, the British High Commissioner in Zanzibar, Timothy Crosthwait, reported no instances of British nationals being attacked and advised against intervention. As a result, the British troops in Kenya were reduced to four hours' standby later that evening. Crosthwait decided not to approve an immediate evacuation of British citizens, as many held key government positions and their sudden removal would further disrupt the country's economy and government.

Within hours of the revolution, the American ambassador had authorised the withdrawal of US citizens on the island, and a US Navy destroyer, the USS Manley, arrived on 13 January. The Manley docked at Zanzibar Town harbour, but the US had not sought the Revolutionary Council's permission for the evacuation, and the ship was met by a group of armed men. Permission was eventually granted on 15 January, but the British considered this confrontation to be the cause of much subsequent ill will against the Western powers in Zanzibar.

Western intelligence agencies believed that the revolution had been organised by communists supplied with weapons by the Warsaw Pact countries. This suspicion was strengthened by the appointment of Babu as Minister for External Affairs and Abdullah Kassim Hanga as Prime Minister, both known leftists with possible communist ties. Britain believed that these two were close associates of Oscar Kambona, the Foreign Affairs Minister of Tanganyika, and that former members of the Tanganyika Rifles had been made available to assist with the revolution. Some members of the Umma Party wore Cuban military fatigues and beards in the style of Fidel Castro, which was taken as an indication of Cuban support for the revolution. However this practice was started by those members who had staffed a ZNP branch office in Cuba and it became a common means of dress amongst opposition party members in the months leading up to the revolution. The new Zanzibar government's recognition of the German Democratic Republic (the first African government to do so) and of North Korea was further evidence to the Western powers that Zanzibar was aligning itself closely with the communist bloc. Just six days after the revolution, The New York Times stated that Zanzibar was "on the verge of becoming the Cuba of Africa", but on 26 January denied that there was active communist involvement. Zanzibar continued to receive support from communist countries and by February was known to be receiving advisers from the Soviet Union, the GDR and China. Cuba also lent its support with Che Guevara stating on 15 August that "Zanzibar is our friend and we gave them our small bit of assistance, our fraternal assistance, our revolutionary assistance at the moment when it was necessary" but denying there were Cuban troops present during the revolution. At the same time, western influence was diminishing and by July 1964 just one Briton, a dentist, remained in the employ of the Zanzibari government. It has been alleged that Israeli spymaster David Kimche was a backer of the revolution with Kimche in Zanzibar on the day of the Revolution.

The deposed Sultan made an unsuccessful appeal to Kenya and Tanganyika for military assistance, although Tanganyika sent 100 paramilitary police officers to Zanzibar to contain rioting. Other than the Tanganyika Rifles (formerly the colonial King's African Rifles), the police were the only armed force in Tanganyika, and on 20 January the police absence led the entire Rifles regiment to mutiny. Dissatisfied with their low pay rates and with the slow progress of the replacement of their British officers with Africans, the soldiers' mutiny sparked similar uprisings in both Uganda and Kenya. However, order on the African mainland was rapidly restored without serious incident by the British Army and Royal Marines.

The possible emergence of an African communist state remained a source of disquiet in the West. In February, the British Defence and Overseas Policy Committee said that, while British commercial interests in Zanzibar were "minute" and the revolution by itself was "not important", the possibility of intervention must be maintained. The committee was concerned that Zanzibar could become a centre for the promotion of communism in Africa, much like Cuba had in the Americas. Britain, most of the Commonwealth, and the US withheld recognition of the new regime until 23 February, by which time it had already been recognised by much of the communist bloc. In Crosthwait's opinion, this contributed to Zanzibar aligning itself with the Soviet Union; Crosthwait and his staff were expelled from the country on 20 February and were only allowed to return once recognition had been agreed.

=== British military response ===
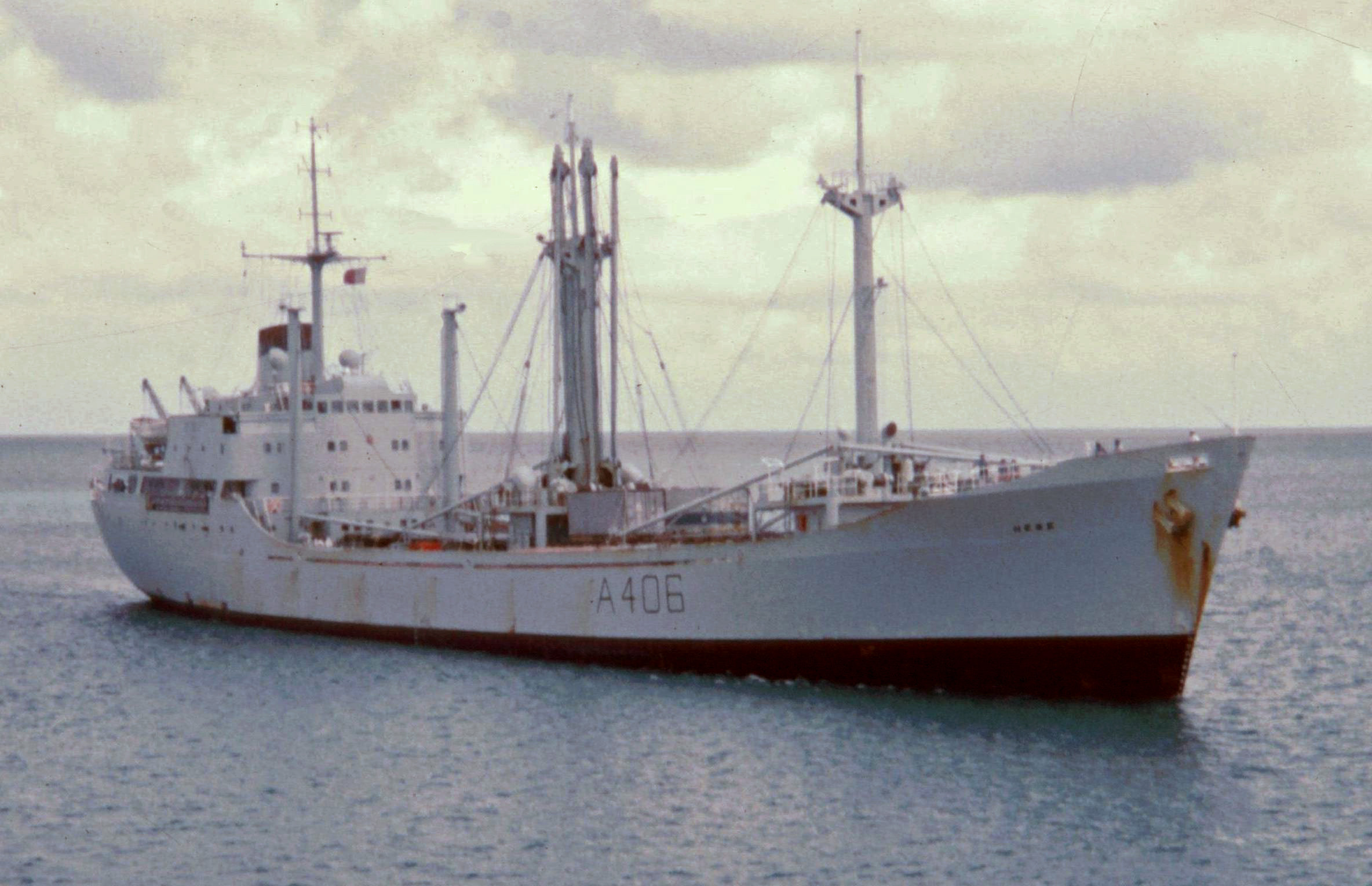
RFA Hebe

Following the evacuation of its citizens on 13 January, the US government stated that it recognised that Zanzibar lay within Britain's sphere of influence, and would not intervene. The US did, however, urge that Britain cooperate with other Southeast African countries to restore order. The first British military vessel on the scene was the survey ship HMS Owen, which was diverted from the Kenyan coast and arrived on the evening of 12 January. Owen was joined on 15 January by the frigate Rhyl and the Royal Fleet Auxiliary ship Hebe. While the lightly armed Owen had been able to provide the revolutionaries with an unobtrusive reminder of Britain's military power, the Hebe and Rhyl were different matters. Due to inaccurate reports that the situation in Zanzibar was deteriorating, the Rhyl was carrying a company of troops of the first battalion of the Staffordshire Regiment from Kenya, the embarkation of which was widely reported in the Kenyan media, and would hinder British negotiations with Zanzibar. The Hebe had just finished removing stores from the naval depot at Mombasa and was loaded with weapons and explosives. Although the Revolutionary Council was unaware of the nature of Hebe's cargo, the Royal Navy's refusal to allow a search of the ship created suspicion ashore and rumors circulated that she was an amphibious assault ship.

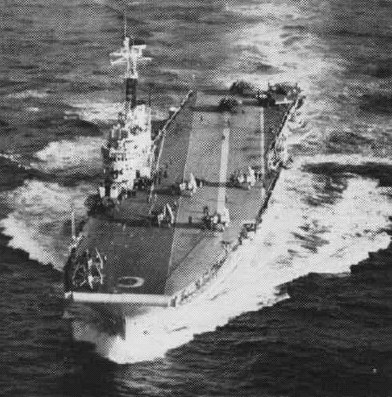
HMS Centaur

A partial evacuation of British citizens was completed by 17 January, when the army riots in Southeast Africa prompted Rhyl's diversion to Tanganyika so that the troops she was carrying could assist in quelling the mutiny. In replacement, a company of the Gordon Highlanders was loaded aboard Owen so an intervention could still be made if necessary. The aircraft carriers Centaur and Victorious were also transferred to the region as part of Operation Parthenon. Although never enacted, Parthenon was intended as a precaution should Okello or the Umma party radicals attempt to seize power from the more moderate ASP. In addition to the two carriers, the plan involved three destroyers, Owen, 13 helicopters, 21 transport and reconnaissance aircraft, the second battalion of the Scots Guards, 45 Commando of the Royal Marines and one company of the second battalion of the Parachute Regiment. The island of Unguja, and its airport, were to be seized by parachute and helicopter assault, followed up by the occupation of Pemba. Parthenon would have been the largest British airborne and amphibious operation since the Suez Crisis.

Following the revelation that the revolutionaries may have received communist bloc training, Operation Parthenon was replaced by Operation Boris. This called for a parachute assault on Unguja from Kenya, but was later abandoned due to poor security in Kenya and the Kenyan government's opposition to the use of its airfields. Instead Operation Finery was drawn up, which would involve a helicopter assault by Royal Marines from HMS Bulwark, a commando carrier then stationed in the Middle East. As Bulwark was outside the region, Finery's launch would require 14 days' notice, so in the event that a more immediate response was necessary, suitable forces were placed on 24 hours' notice to launch a smaller scale operation to protect British citizens.

With the merger of Tanganyika and Zanzibar on 23 April, there were concerns that the Umma Party would stage a coup; Operation Shed was designed to provide for intervention should this happen. Shed would have required a battalion of troops, with scout cars, to be airlifted to the island to seize the airfield and protect Karume's government. However, the danger of a revolt over unification soon passed, and on 29 April the troops earmarked for Shed were reduced to 24 hours' notice. Operation Finery was cancelled the same day. Concern over a possible coup remained though, and around 23 September Shed was replaced with Plan Giralda, involving the use of British troops from Aden and the Far East, to be enacted if the Umma Party attempted to overthrow President Julius Nyerere of Tanzania. An infantry battalion, tactical headquarters unit and elements of the Royal Marines would have been shipped to Zanzibar to launch an amphibious assault, supported by follow-on troops from British bases in Kenya or Aden to maintain law and order. Giralda was scrapped in December, ending British plans for military intervention in the country.

== Legacy ==
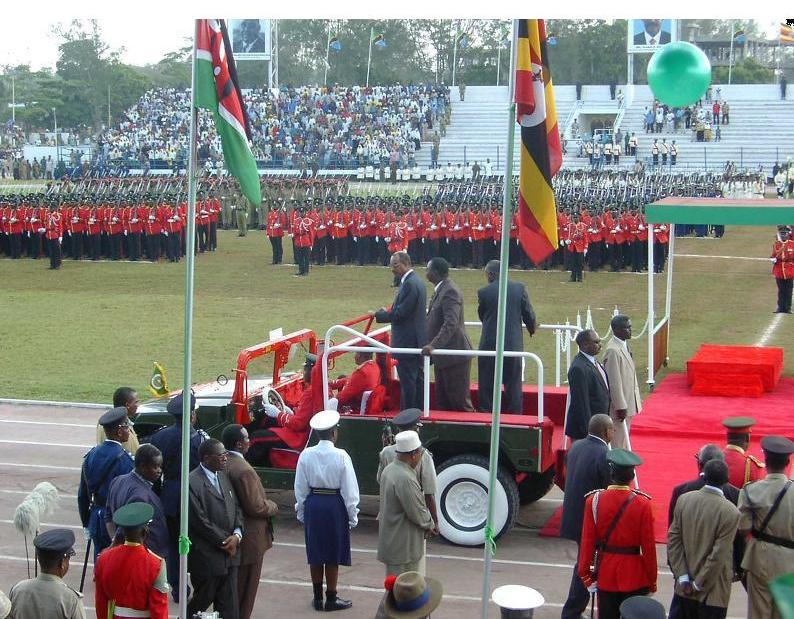
President Amani Abeid Karume participating in a military parade to mark the 40th anniversary of the revolution

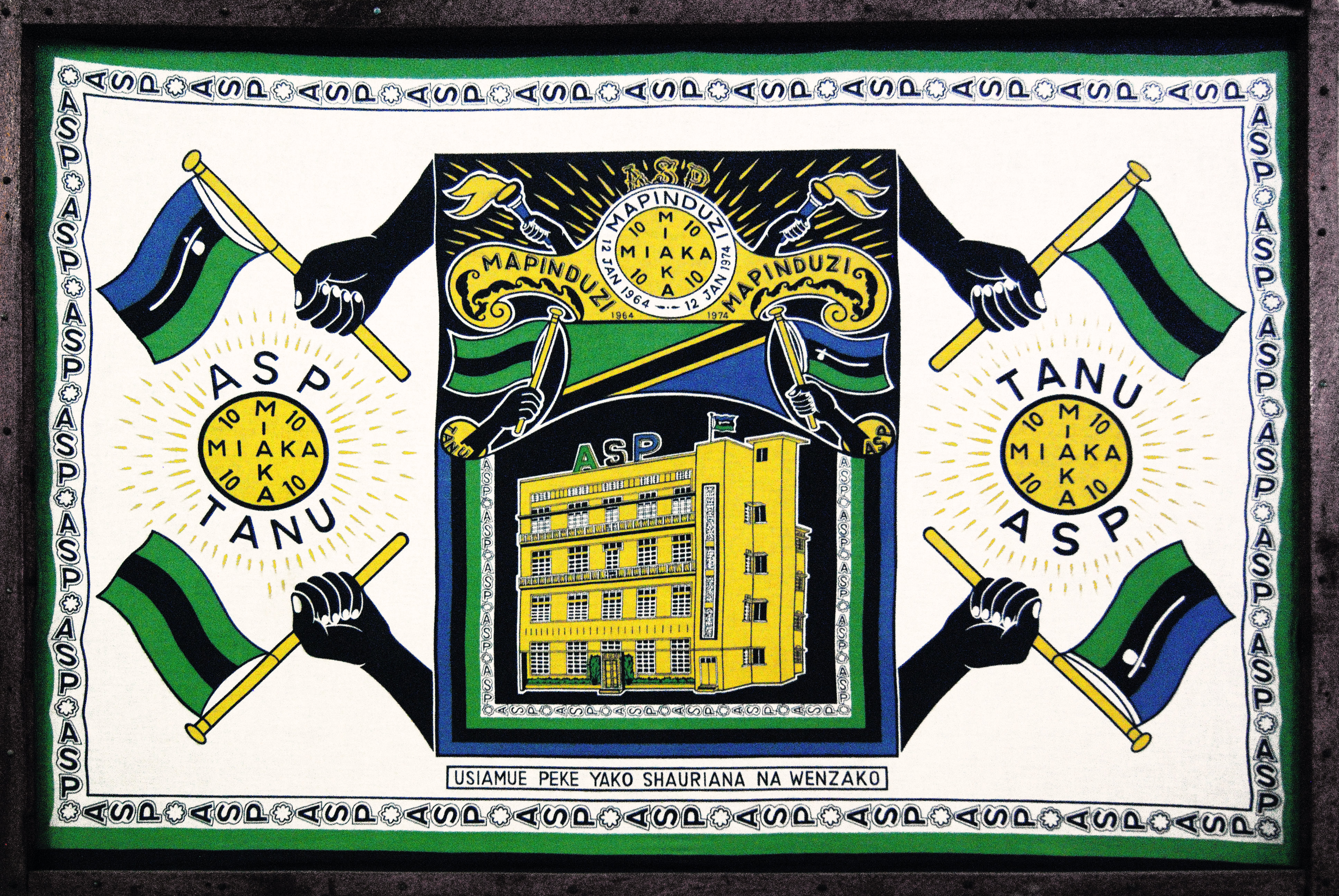
A kanga celebrating ten years since the revolution (mapinduzi), with references to the ASP and TANU (museum of the House of Wonders, Stone Town)

One of the main results of the revolution in Zanzibar was to break the power of the Arab/Asian ruling class, who had held it for around 200 years. Despite the merger with Tanganyika, Zanzibar retained a Revolutionary Council and House of Representatives. Until 1992 it was run on a one-party system and has power over domestic matters.

The domestic government is led by the President of Zanzibar, Karume being the first holder of this office. This government used the success of the revolution to implement reforms across the island. Many of these involved the removal of power from Arabs. The Zanzibar civil service, for example, became an almost entirely African organisation, and land was redistributed from Arabs to Africans. The revolutionary government also instituted social reforms such as free healthcare and opening up the education system to African students (who had occupied only 12 per cent of secondary school places before the revolution).

The government sought help from the Soviet Union, the German Democratic Republic (GDR), and People's Republic of China for funding for several projects and military advice. The failure of several GDR-led projects including the New Zanzibar Project, a 1968 urban redevelopment scheme to provide new apartments for all Zanzibaris, led to Zanzibar focusing on Chinese aid. The post-revolution Zanzibar government was accused of draconian controls on personal freedoms and travel, and exercised nepotism in appointments to political and industrial offices, with the new Tanzanian government being powerless to intervene.

Dissatisfaction with the government came to a head with the assassination of Karume on 7 April 1972, which was followed by weeks of fighting between pro- and anti-government forces. A multi-party system was eventually established in 1992, but Zanzibar remains dogged by allegations of corruption and vote-rigging. The 2010 general election was seen to be a considerable improvement.

The revolution itself remains an event of interest for Zanzibaris and academics. Historians have analysed the revolution as having a racial and a social basis, with some stating that the African revolutionaries represent the proletariat rebelling against the ruling and trading classes, represented by the Arabs and South Asians. Others discount this theory and present it as a racial revolution that was exacerbated by economic disparity between races.

Within Zanzibar, the revolution is a key cultural event, marked by the release of 545 prisoners on its tenth anniversary and by a military parade on its 40th. Zanzibar Revolution Day has been designated as a public holiday by the government of Tanzania; it is celebrated on 12 January each year.

The Mapinduzi Cup (Revolution Cup), an association football knockout competition, is organized by the Zanzibar Football Association in early January between 6 and 13 January to mark the revolution day (12 January).
