= January 1961 Zanzibari general election =

General election in Zanzibar

General elections were held in Zanzibar on 17 January 1961 for the Legislative Council. The result saw the Afro-Shirazi Party win ten seats, the Zanzibar Nationalist Party nine, and the Zanzibar and Pemba People's Party three.

The Afro-Shirazi Party (ASP) won ten seats, and the Zanzibar Nationalist Party (ZNP) won nine; the ASP won the constituency of Chake-Chake by just one vote, with 1,538 votes to the ZNP's 1,537. The Guinness Book of World Records listed the result in its annual editions under "Closest election".

As both the ASP and the ZNP attempted to form a government, two ZPPP members joined the ZNP and one the ASP. Due to the resulting stalemate, fresh elections were held in June.

== Results ==
Party	Votes	%	Seats	+/–
Afro-Shirazi Party	36,698	43.19	10	+5
Zanzibar Nationalist Party	32,724	38.52	9	+9
Zanzibar and Pemba People's Party	15,541	18.29	3	New
Total	84,963	100.00	22	+16
Registered voters/turnout	94,310	–		
Source: African Elections Database
