= Mwera, Zanzibar =

Village in Zanzibar, Tanzania

Mwera
- Coordinates: 5°29′1″S 38°57′4″E

Mwera is a village in Zanzibar east of Zanzibar City on the road to the western coast of the island.

Mwera was the location of many Arab-owned clove and coconut plantations throughout the 19th century. By the 21st century, most residents of Mwera had their origins in mainland Tanzania. Abeid Karume, the first president of Zanzibar after the 1964 revolution, was reported to have been born in Mwera.
