= ZNP =

ZNP may refer to:

- K-Class (ZNP-K)
- Zanzibar Nationalist Party
- Zinc pyrithione
- Zion National Park
- Zoram Nationalist Party
- Związek Nauczycielstwa Polskiego (Polish Teachers' Union)
