= Foreign relations of Zanzibar =

The foreign relations of Zanzibar refer to the relationships with other nations by the independent Zanzibari government which existed from 1856 to 1964, when the Zanzibar Revolution overthrew the ruling Sultan and unified the country with Tanganyika, forming Tanzania.

== British ==
In 1890, Zanzibar gave up formal control over its foreign relations to the British Empire.

In 1906, the United States of America formalized a treaty in which they relinquished any claims to Zanzibar in favor of the British Empire.

== Unification ==
Following the unification and creation of Tanzania, Zanzibar's foreign relations were handled by the joint government in Dar es Salaam and later Dodoma.
