= June 1961 Zanzibari general election =

General election in Zanzibar

General elections were held in Zanzibar on 1 June 1961, following the inconclusive elections in January. One further constituency, Mtambile, was created on the island of Pemba, with the hope that this would break the deadlock. The Zanzibar Nationalist Party and the Afro-Shirazi Party both won ten seats, despite the fact that the ASP had received just over 50% of the votes and the ZNP only 35%. The other three seats were won by the Zanzibar and Pemba People's Party three. The ZNP and ZPPP formed a coalition government.

Of the 93,918 registered voters, 90,595 voted, giving a turnout of 96%.

== Results ==
Party	Votes	%	Seats	+/–
Afro-Shirazi Party	45,172	50.60	10	0
Zanzibar Nationalist Party	31,681	35.49	10	+1
Zanzibar and Pemba People's Party	12,411	13.90	3	0
Total	89,264	100.00	23	+1
Valid votes	89,264	98.53		
Invalid/blank votes	1,331	1.47		
Total votes	90,595	100.00		
Registered voters/turnout	93,918	96.46		
Source: Nohlen et al.
