= Abdullah bin Khalifa =

Sultan of Zanzibar from 1960 to 1963

Sir Abdullah bin Khalifa عبد الله بن خليفة (Arabic)
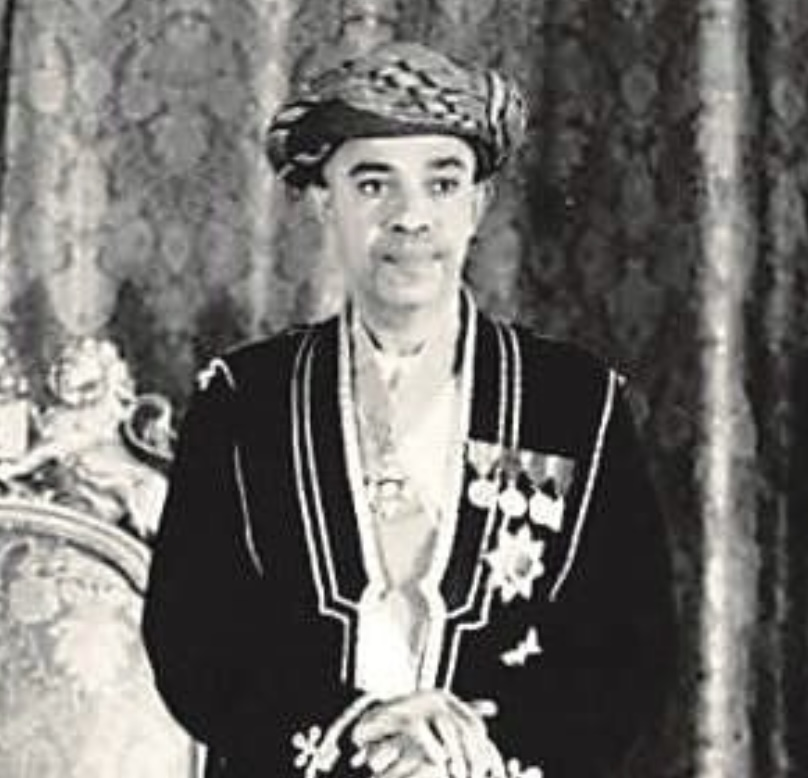
- Sultan Abdullah c. 1960–63

Sultan of Zanzibar
- Reign: 6 October 1960 – 1 July 1963
- Predecessor: Sir Khalifa bin Harub
- Successor: Jamshid bin Abdullah
- Born: 13 February 1911
- Died: 1 July 1963 (aged 52)
- House: Al Bu Said
- Father: Khalifa bin Harub of Zanzibar

Sir Abdullah bin Khalifa Al-Busaidi, KBE, CMG (13 February 1911 – 1 July 1963) (Arabic: عبد الله بن خليفة), was the 10th Sultan of Zanzibar after the death of his father, Sir Khalifa bin Harub, who died on 9 October 1960 at age eighty-one. He was less popular than his father and had a rough reign as Sultan during a period of rising African nationalism. In addition, by the time of his death, both his legs had been amputated due to disease.

He ruled Zanzibar from 9 October 1960 to 1 July 1963. On his death, he was succeeded as Sultan by his son Jamshid, who was deposed during the Zanzibar Revolution in January 1964.

== Honours ==
- King George V Silver Jubilee Medal – 1935
- Companion of the Order of St Michael and St George (CMG) – 1936
- Order of the Brilliant Star of Zanzibar, 1st Class – (1936–1960, then Sovereign to 1963)
- Sultan Khalifa II Silver Jubilee Medal – 1937
- King George VI Coronation Medal – 1937
- Queen Elizabeth II Coronation Medal – 1953
- Knight Commander of the Order of the British Empire (KBE) – 1959
- US President John F. Kennedy's staff ordered a gold plaque in 1963 from Galt & Bro, a Washington D.C.–based jeweler, as a gift for the Sultan. But following the President's assassination in November 1963, the gift was never picked up.

== Children ==
- Sultan Sayyid Jamshid Bin Abdullah Bin Khalifa Bin Harub
- Sayyida Sughiya Bint Abdullah Bin Khalifa Bin Harub
- Sayyida Sindiya Bint Abdullah Bin Khalifa Bin Harub
- Sayyid Mohammed Bin Abdullah Bin Khalifa Bin Harub
- Sayyida Shariffa Bint Abdullah Bin Khalifa Bin Harub
- Sayyid Harub Bin Abdullah Bin Khalifa Bin Harub

== Ancestry ==
Ancestors of Abdullah bin Khalifa

8. Thuwaini bin Said
4. Harub bin Thuwaini Al Said
9. Ghaliya bint Salim Al Busaidi
2. Khalifa bin Harub Al Said
10. Turki bin Said
5. Turkiya bint Turki Al Said
11. A daughter of Hamad bin Salim Al Busaidi
1. Abdullah bin Khalifa Al Said
12. Mohammed bin Said Al Said
6. Hamud bin Mohammed Al Said
13. Ziana bint Mohammed Al Said
3. Matuka bint Hamud Al Said
14. Majid bin Said
7. Khanfora bint Majid Al Said

Abdullah bin Khalifa Sa'îd dynasty Born: February 12 1910 Died: July 1 1963
Regnal titles
| Preceded by Khalifa bin Harub | Sultan of Zanzibar; 1960–1963 | Succeeded by Jamshid bin Abdullah |
