= Khalifa bin Harub =

Sultan of Zanzibar from 1911 to 1960

Sir Khalifa bin Harub GCB GCMG GBE
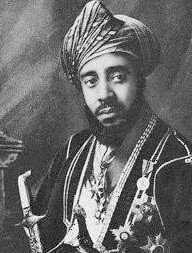

Sultan of Zanzibar
- Reign: 9 December 1911 – 9 October 1960
- Predecessor: Ali bin Hamud
- Successor: Sir Abdullah bin Khalifa
- Born: 26 August 1879; Muscat, Oman
- Died: 9 October 1960 (aged 81); Stone Town, Zanzibar
- Spouse: Sayyida Matuka bint Hamud Al-Busaid (m. 1900); Sultana Nunu
- Issue: Abdullah bin Khalifa of Zanzibar
Names
- Khalifa bin Harub bin Thuwaini Al-Busaidi
- House: Al Bu Said
- Father: Harub bin Thuwaini
- Mother: Turkiya bint Turki Al Busaidi
- Religion: Ibadi Islam

Sir Khalifa II bin Harub Al-Busaidi (26 August 1879 – 9 October 1960) (Arabic: السيد خليفة بن حارب البوسعيدي) was the 9th Sultan of Zanzibar from 9 December 1911 until his death on 9 October 1960.

His reign was around 48 years and 10 months long, making him the longest-reigning Sultan of Zanzibar in history.

== Biography ==
=== Early life ===
Khalifa bin Harub was born on 26 August 1879 in Muscat, Oman. His father was Harub bin Thuwaini, a son of Thuwaini bin Said, Sultan of Muscat and Oman, and his mother was Turkiya bint Turki Al Busaidi.

In 1900, he married Sayyida Matuka bint Hamud Al-Busaid, daughter of the seventh Sultan of Zanzibar and sister of the eighth Sultan. He also married his second wife, Sultana Nunu.

=== Reign ===
Khalifa ruled during a period in which Zanzibar had limited sovereignty. While he retained ceremonial authority and influence over religious and cultural affairs, foreign policy, defense, and major administrative decisions were controlled by Britain. Despite this, Khalifa maintained a pragmatic and cooperative relationship with the British, which ensured political stability and preserved the monarchy during turbulent decades, including World War I and World War II.

Under his reign, Zanzibar saw the expansion of roads and ports, improvement of public health services, modernization of administrative institutions, and growth of clove plantations, which remained the backbone of Zanzibar's economy.

=== Social and religious affairs ===
Khalifa was a devout Muslim and a strong supporter of Islamic institutions. He patronized mosques, madrasahs, and Islamic courts (Qadi system). He promoted religious tolerance, as Zanzibar was home to Muslims, Christians, Hindus, and others.

=== Education ===
He also supported the expansion of formal education, including schools for Arabs and Africans. He encouraged both Islamic education and modern secular learning, helping Zanzibar transition into the modern era. He visited Makerere University on a trip to Uganda on 30 April 1954.

Part of the museum of the Sultan's Palace in Zanzibar is dedicated to Sir Khalifa.

=== Death ===
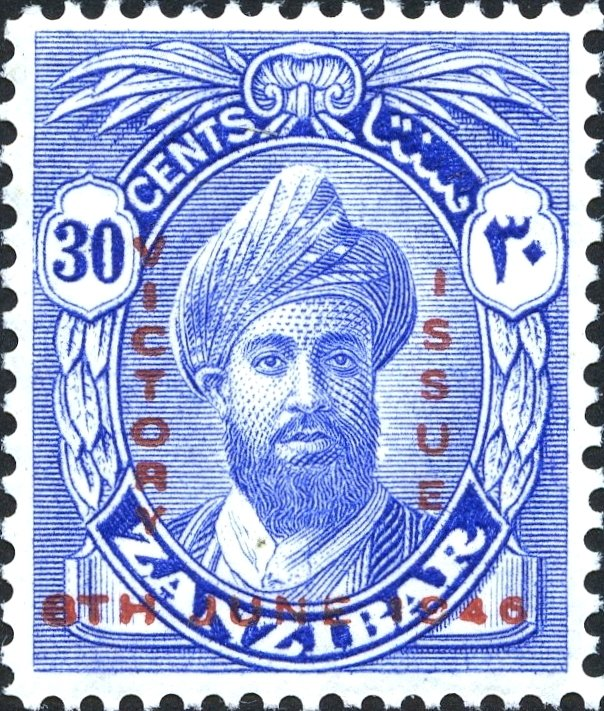
Portrait of Khalifa bin Harub on a 1946 Zanzibar issued stamp

Sultan Khalifa bin Harub died on 9 October 1960, at the age of 81, after nearly half a century on the throne. He was succeeded by his eldest surviving son, Abdullah bin Khalifa, who reigned from 1960 until his death in 1963.

== Honours ==
- King George V Coronation Medal – 1911
- Grand Cordon of the Saidi Order of Oman
- King George V Silver Jubilee Medal – 1935
- Knight Grand Cross of the Order of the British Empire (GBE) – 1935 (KBE – 1919) (Honorary)
- Knight Grand Cross of the Order of St Michael and St George (GCMG) – 1936 (KCMG – 1914)
- King George VI Coronation Medal – 1937
- Commander of the Order of the Shield and Spears of Buganda
- Queen Elizabeth II Coronation Medal – 1953
- Knight Grand Cross of the Order of the Bath (GCB) – 1956

== Ancestry ==
Ancestors of Khalifa bin Harub

8. Said bin Sultan (= 12)
4. Thuwaini bin Said
2. Harub bin Thuwaini Al Said
10. Salim bin Sultan
5. Ghaliya bint Salim Al Busaidi
1. Khalifa bin Harub Al Said
12. Said bin Sultan (= 8)
6. Turki bin Said
3. Turkiya bint Turki Al Said
14. Hamad bin Salim Al Busaid
7. A daughter of Hamad bin Salim Al Busaidi

== See also ==
- Abdullah bin Khalifa
- Sultanate of Zanzibar

Regnal titles
Preceded by Ali bin Hamud	Sultan of Zanzibar; 1911–1960	Succeeded by Abdullah bin Khalifa
