= Sultanate of Zanzibar =

1856–1964 East African Muslim state

Sultanate of Zanzibar: سلطنة زنجبار (Arabic); اوسلطني و زنزبار (Swahili); Usultani wa Zanzibar (Swahili)
- 1856–1964
- Flag (1963–1964) Emblem
- Anthem: National Anthem of Zanzibar (until 1890) National March for the Sultan of Zanzibar (1911–1964)
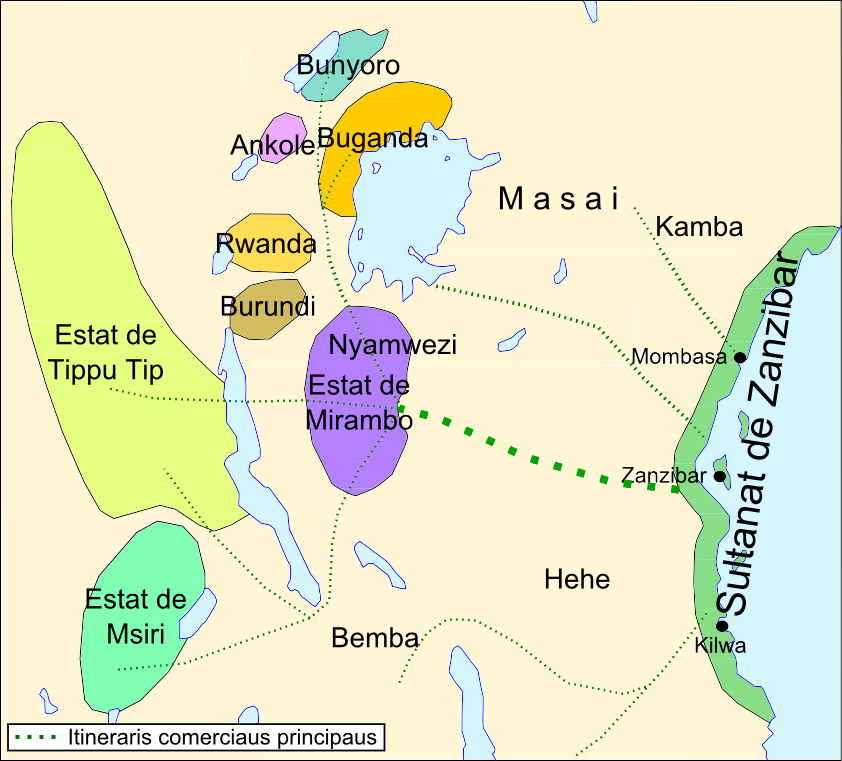
- Sultanate of Zanzibar c. 1875
- Status: Sovereign state (1856–90); British protectorate (1890–1963); Sovereign state (1963–64)
- Capital: Stone Town
- Common languages: Swahili; Arabic; English
- Religion: Islam
- Demonym: Zanzibari
- Government: Absolute monarchy (1856–1963); Constitutional monarchy (10 December 1963 – 12 January 1964)
- Sultan
  - 1856–1870: Majid bin Said (first)
  - 1963–1964: Jamshid bin Abdullah Al Said (last)
- Chief Minister
  - 1961: Geoffrey Lawrence
  - 1961–1964: Muhammad Hamadi
- History
  - Divided dynasty: 19 October 1856
  - Zanzibar Guarantee Treaty: 10 March 1862
  - Heligoland–Zanzibar Treaty: 1 July 1890
  - Anglo-Zanzibar War: 27 August 1896
  - End of British Protectorate: 10 December 1963
  - Zanzibar Revolution: 12 January 1964

Population
  - 1964: 300,000
- Currency: Zanzibari ryal (1882–1908); Zanzibari rupee (1908–1935); East African shilling (1935–1964); Indian rupee and Maria Theresa thaler also circulated
Preceded by	Succeeded by
Omani Empire	People's Republic of Zanzibar
- Today part of: Kenya; Tanzania; Mozambique; Democratic Republic of the Congo; Uganda; Rwanda; Burundi; Zambia; Madagascar; Comoros

The Sultanate of Zanzibar, (Note: Swahili: Usultani wa Zanzibar Arabic: سلطنة زنجبار, romanized: Sulṭanat Zanjībār) also known as the Zanzibar Sultanate, was an East African Muslim state controlled by the Sultan of Zanzibar, in existence between 1856 and 1964. The Sultanate's territories varied over time, and after a period of decline, the state had sovereignty over only the Zanzibar Archipelago and a 16-kilometre-wide (10 mi) strip along the Kenyan coast, with the interior of Kenya constituting the British Kenya Colony and the coastal strip administered as a de facto part of that colony.

Under an agreement reached on 8 October 1963, the Sultan of Zanzibar relinquished sovereignty over his remaining territory on the mainland, and on 12 December 1963, Kenya officially obtained independence from the British. On 12 January 1964, revolutionaries led by the African Afro-Shirazi Party overthrew the mainly Arab government. Jamshid bin Abdullah, the last sultan, was deposed and lost sovereignty over Zanzibar, marking the end of the Sultanate, and resulted in the massacre of tens of thousands of Arabs. It was also involved in the shortest war in history, the Anglo-Zanzibar War, which lasted 38 minutes on the morning of 27 August 1896.

== History ==
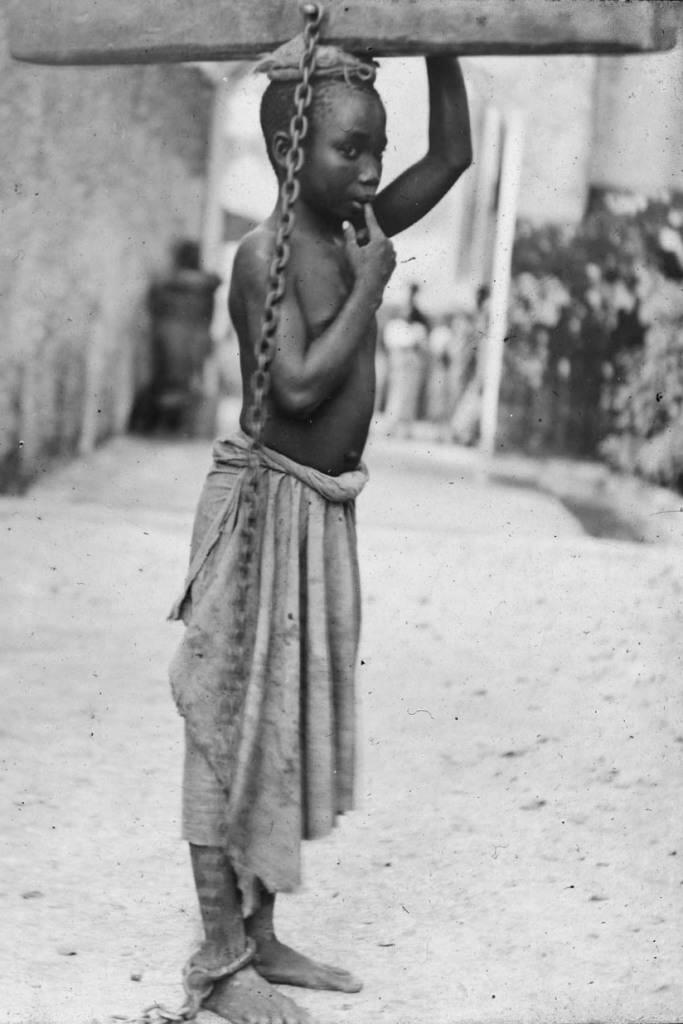
Photograph of an enslaved boy in the Sultanate of Zanzibar. 'An Arab master's punishment for a slight offence.' c. 1890.

=== Founding ===
According to the 16th-century explorer Leo Africanus, Zanzibar (Zanguebar) was the term used by Arabs and Persians to refer to the eastern African coast running from Kenya to Mozambique, dominated by five semi-independent Muslim kingdoms: Mombasa, Malindi, Kilwa, Mozambique, and Sofala. Africanus further noted that they all had standing agreements of loyalty with the major central African states, including the Kingdom of Mutapa.

In 1698, Zanzibar became part of the overseas holdings of Oman after Saif bin Sultan, the Imam of Oman, defeated the Portuguese in Mombasa, in what is now Kenya. In 1832 or 1840, Omani ruler Said bin Sultan moved his court from Muscat to Stone Town on the island of Unguja (that is, Zanzibar Island). He established a ruling Arab elite and encouraged the development of clove plantations, using the island's slave labour. The East African slave trade flourished greatly from the second half of the nineteenth century, when Saif bin Sultan made Zanzibar his capital and expanded international commercial activities and plantation economy in cloves and coconuts.

Zanzibar's commerce fell increasingly into the hands of traders from the Indian subcontinent, whom Said encouraged to settle on the island. After his death in 1856, two of his sons, Majid bin Said and Thuwaini bin Said, struggled over the succession, so Zanzibar and Oman were divided into two separate realms. Thuwaini became the Sultan of Muscat and Oman while Majid became the first Sultan of Zanzibar, but obliged to pay an annual tribute to the Omani court in Muscat. During his 14-year reign as Sultan, Majid consolidated his power around the local slave trade. Pressed by the British, his successor, Barghash bin Said, helped abolish the slave trade in Zanzibar and largely developed the country's infrastructure. The third Sultan, Khalifa bin Said, also furthered the country's progress toward abolishing slavery.

=== Context for the Sultan's loss of control over his dominions ===
Until 1884, the Sultans of Zanzibar controlled a substantial portion of the Swahili Coast, known as Zanj, and trading routes extending further into the continent, as far as Kindu on the Congo River. That year, however, the Society for German Colonization forced local chiefs on the mainland to agree to German protection, prompting Sultan Bargash bin Said to protest. Coinciding with the Berlin Conference and the Scramble for Africa, further German interest in the area was soon shown in 1885 by the arrival of the newly created German East Africa Company, which had a mission to colonize the area.

In 1886, the British and Germans secretly met and discussed their aims of expansion in the African Great Lakes, with spheres of influence already agreed upon the year before, with the British to take what would become the East Africa Protectorate (now Kenya) and the Germans to take present-day Tanzania. Both powers leased coastal territory from Zanzibar and established trading stations and outposts. Over the next few years, all of the mainland possessions of Zanzibar came to be administered by European imperial powers, beginning in 1888 when the Imperial British East Africa Company took over administration of Mombasa.

The same year the German East Africa Company acquired formal direct rule over the coastal area previously submitted to German protection. This resulted in a native uprising, the Abushiri revolt, which was suppressed by the Kaiserliche Marine and heralded the end of Zanzibar's influence on the mainland.

The blockade of Zanzibar (1888–1889) was a joint international operation led by Germany, with the support of the British Empire, Portugal and Italy, against the Sultanate of Zanzibar, with the aim of ending the slave and arms trade off the eastern coast of Africa. This coalition aimed to coerce Sultan Khalifa bin Said of Zanzibar into rigorously enforcing existing treaties that prohibited the maritime slave trade and the illicit arms trade emanating from his East African dominions.

==== Establishment of the Zanzibar Protectorate ====
With the signing of the Heligoland-Zanzibar Treaty between the United Kingdom and the German Empire in 1890, Zanzibar itself became a British protectorate. In August 1896, following the death of Sultan Hamad bin Thuwaini, Britain and Zanzibar fought a 38-minute war, the shortest in recorded history. A struggle for succession took place as the Sultan's cousin Khalid bin Barghash seized power. The British instead wanted Hamoud bin Mohammed to become Sultan, believing that he would be much easier to work with. The British gave Khalid an hour to vacate the Sultan's palace in Stone Town. Khalid failed to do so, and instead assembled an army of 2,800 men to fight the British. The British launched an attack on the palace and other locations around the city after which Khalid retreated and later went into exile. Hamoud was then peacefully installed as Sultan.

That "Zanzibar" for these purposes included the 16 km (10 mi) coastal strip of Kenya that would later become the Protectorate of Kenya was a matter recorded in the parliamentary debates at the time.

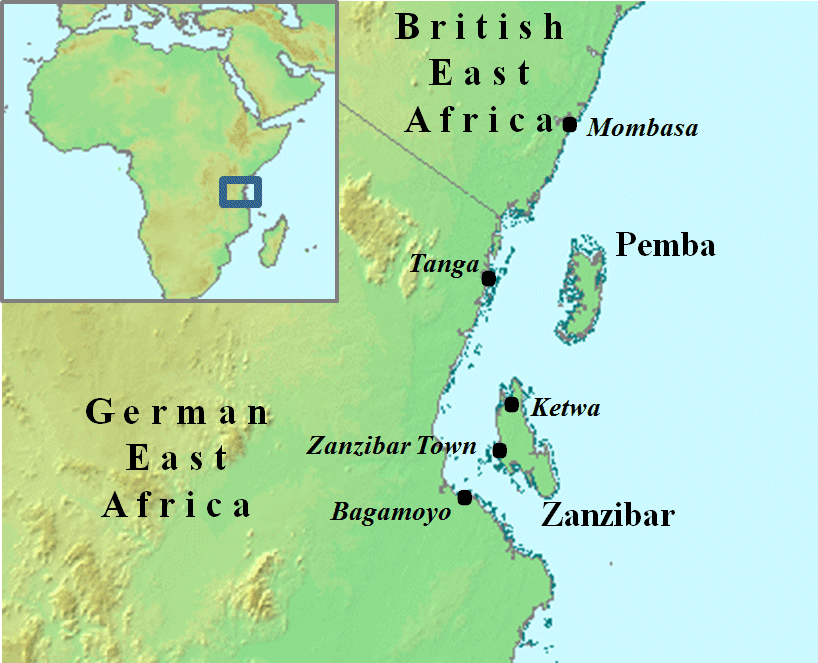
Island of Unguja and the African mainland

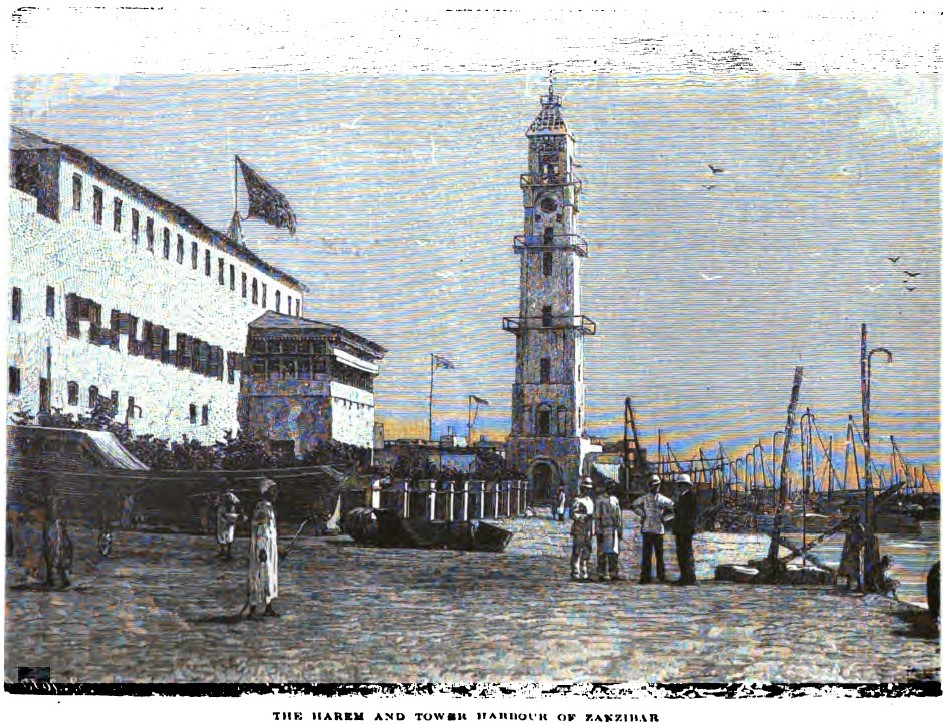
The Harem and Tower Harbour of Zanzibar, 1890

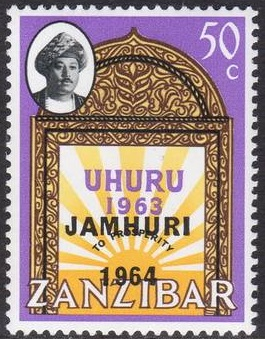
Independence stamp overprinted "Republic"

==== Establishment of the East Africa Protectorate ====
In 1886, the British government encouraged William Mackinnon, who already had an agreement with the Sultan and whose shipping company traded extensively in the African Great Lakes, to increase British influence in the region. He formed a British East Africa Association which led to the Imperial British East Africa Company being chartered in 1888 and given the original grant to administer the territory. It administered about 240 km (150 mi) of coastline stretching from the River Jubba via Mombasa to German East Africa which were leased from the Sultan. The British "sphere of influence", agreed at the Berlin Conference of 1885, extended up the coast and inland across the future Kenya and after 1890 included Uganda as well. Mombasa was the administrative centre at this time.

However, the company began to fail, and on 1 July 1895 the British government proclaimed a protectorate, the East Africa Protectorate, the administration being transferred to the Foreign Office. In 1902, administration was again transferred to the Colonial Office and the Uganda territory was incorporated as part of the protectorate also. In 1897 Lord Delamere, the pioneer of white settlement, arrived in the Kenya highlands, which was then part of the Protectorate. Lord Delamere was impressed by the agricultural possibilities of the area. In 1902 the boundaries of the Protectorate were extended to include what was previously the Eastern Province of Uganda. Also, in 1902, the East Africa Syndicate received a grant of 1,300 km^{2} (500 sq mi) to promote white settlement in the Highlands. Lord Delamere now commenced extensive farming operations, and in 1905, when a large number of immigrants arrived from Britain and South Africa, the Protectorate was transferred from the authority of the Foreign Office to that of the Colonial Office. The capital was shifted from Mombasa to Nairobi in 1905. A regular Government and Legislature were constituted by Order in Council in 1906. This constituted the administrator a governor and provided for legislative and executive councils. Lieutenant Colonel J. Hayes Sadler was the first governor and commander in chief. There were occasional troubles with local tribes but the country was opened up by the colonial government with little bloodshed. After the First World War, more immigrants arrived from Britain and South Africa, and by 1919 the European population was estimated at 9,000 strong.

==== Loss of sovereignty over Kenya ====
On 23 July 1920, the inland areas of the East Africa Protectorate were annexed as British dominions by Order in Council. That part of the former Protectorate was thereby constituted as the Colony of Kenya and from that time, the Sultan of Zanzibar ceased to be sovereign over that territory. The remaining 16 km (10 mi) wide coastal strip (with the exception of Witu) remained a Protectorate under an agreement with the Sultan of Zanzibar. That coastal strip, remaining under the sovereignty of the Sultan of Zanzibar, was constituted as the Protectorate of Kenya in 1920.

The Protectorate of Kenya was governed as part of the Colony of Kenya by virtue of an agreement between the United Kingdom and the Sultan dated 14 December 1895.

The Colony of Kenya and the Protectorate of Kenya each came to an end on 12 December 1963. The United Kingdom ceded sovereignty over the Colony of Kenya and, under an agreement dated 8 October 1963, the Sultan agreed that simultaneously with independence for Kenya, the Sultan would cease to have sovereignty over the Protectorate of Kenya. In this way, Kenya became an independent country under the Kenya Independence Act 1963. Exactly 12 months later on 12 December 1964, Kenya became a republic under the name "Republic of Kenya".

==== End of the Zanzibar Protectorate and deposition of the Sultan ====
On 10 December 1963, the Protectorate that had existed over Zanzibar since 1890 was terminated by the United Kingdom. The United Kingdom did not grant Zanzibar independence, as such, because the UK never had sovereignty over Zanzibar. Rather, by the Zanzibar Act 1963 of the United Kingdom, the UK ended the Protectorate and made provision for full self-government in Zanzibar as an independent country within the Commonwealth. Upon the Protectorate being abolished, Zanzibar became a constitutional monarchy within the Commonwealth under the Sultan. Sultan Jamshid bin Abdullah was overthrown a month later during the Zanzibar Revolution. Jamshid fled into exile, and the Sultanate was replaced by the People's Republic of Zanzibar. In April 1964, the existence of this socialist republic was ended with its union with Tanganyika to form the United Republic of Tanganyika and Zanzibar, which became known as Tanzania six months later.

== Demographics ==
By 1964, the country was a constitutional monarchy within the Commonwealth ruled by Sultan Jamshid bin Abdullah. Zanzibar had a population of around 230,000 natives, some of whom claimed Persian ancestry and were known locally as Shirazis. It also contained significant minorities in the 50,000 Arabs and 20,000 South Asians who were prominent in business and trade. The various ethnic groups were becoming mixed and the distinctions between them had blurred; according to one historian, an important reason for the general support for Sultan Jamshid was his family's ethnic diversity. However, the island's Arab inhabitants, as the major landowners, were generally wealthier than the natives; the major political parties were organised largely along ethnic lines, with Arabs dominating the Zanzibar Nationalist Party (ZNP) and natives the Afro-Shirazi Party (ASP).

== See also ==
- List of sultans of Zanzibar
- Zanzibar
- Swahili coast
- Kilwa Sultanate

== Bibliography ==
- Appiah, Kwame Anthony; Gates, Henry Louis Jr., eds. (1999), Africana: The Encyclopedia of the African and African American Experience, New York: Basic Books, ISBN 0-465-00071-1, OCLC 41649745
- Ingrams, William H. (1967), Zanzibar: Its History and Its People, Abingdon: Routledge, ISBN 0-7146-1102-6, OCLC 186237036
- Ayany, Samuel G. (1970), A History of Zanzibar: A Study in Constitutional Development, 1934–1964, Nairobi: East African Literature Bureau, OCLC 201465
- Michler, Ian (2007), Zanzibar: The Insider's Guide (2nd ed.), Cape Town: Struik Publishers, ISBN 978-1-77007-014-1, OCLC 165410708
- Parsons, Timothy (2003), The 1964 Army Mutinies and the Making of Modern East Africa, Greenwood Publishing Group, ISBN 0-325-07068-7.
- Shillington, Kevin (2005), Encyclopedia of African History, CRC Press, ISBN 1-57958-245-1.
- Speller, Ian (2007), "An African Cuba? Britain and the Zanzibar Revolution, 1964.", Journal of Imperial and Commonwealth History, 35 (2): 1–35, doi:10.1080/03086530701337666, S2CID 159656717.
- United States Department of State (1975), Countries of the World and Their Leaders (2nd ed.), Detroit: Gale Research Company, OCLC 1492755
