= Geoffrey Charles Lawrence =

Geoffrey Charles Lawrence, CMG, OBE (11 November 1915 – 5 June 1994) was a British colonial servant in Africa. He served as the financial secretary of Zanzibar from 1960 to 1963.

Born in London and educated at the Stationers' Company's School, Lawrence joined Barclays Bank before being sent with the Territorial Army to fight in North Africa. He then volunteered for the Somaliland Camel Corps. By the end of the Second World War, he had attained the rank of major. Upon applying for the Colonial Service, he was sent to Brasenose College, Oxford, to acquire administrative skills. He and his wife Joyce then spent 16 years in and around East Africa. His appointments included district commissioner in Berbera; assistant chief secretary and finance secretary in Hargeisa; and financial secretary in Zanzibar until the introduction of internal self-government in 1963.

He served as acting Chief Minister of Zanzibar from 23 February 1961 to 5 June 1961.
