= Jamshid bin Abdullah =

Sultan of Zanzibar from 1963 to 1964

Jamshid bin Abdullah: جمشيد بن عبد الله
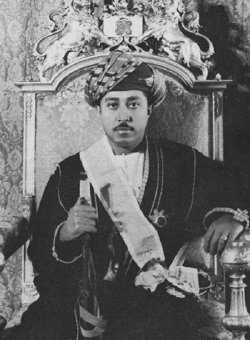
- Sultan Jamshid in 1963

Sultan of Zanzibar
- Reign: 1 July 1963 – 12 January 1964
- Predecessor: Sir Abdullah bin Khalifa
- Successor: Monarchy abolished Abeid Amani Karume (as President of Zanzibar)
- Born: 16 September 1929; Zanzibar Town, Zanzibar
- Died: 30 December 2024 (aged 95); Muscat, Oman
- Burial: Muscat Royal Cemetery
- Spouse: Zuleika bint Abdullah Al Aufy
- Issue: Ali III bin Jamshid Al Said
- House: Al Bu Said
- Father: Sir Abdullah bin Khalifa Al Said
- Mother: Sayyida Tohfa bint Ali Al Said

Jamshid bin Abdullah Al Busaidi, GCMG (Arabic: جمشيد بن عبد الله البوسعيدي; 16 September 1929 – 30 December 2024) was a Zanzibari royal who was the last reigning Sultan of Zanzibar. He was deposed in the Zanzibar Revolution, after the United Kingdom gave up its protectorate.

== Early life of Jamshid bin Abdullah Al Busaidi ==
Sultan Jamshid was born in Zanzibar Town, Zanzibar on 16 September 1929. He was educated in Alexandria and Beirut. He also served in the British Royal Navy for 2 years, gaining leadership experience before undertaking administrative roles under his grandfather, Sultan Khalifa bin Harub.

== Sultan of Zanzibar ==
Jamshid ruled Zanzibar from 1 July 1963 to 12 January 1964. On 10 December 1963, the United Kingdom gave up its British protectorate over the already self-governing Zanzibar, leaving it as a constitutional monarchy within the Commonwealth under Jamshid, responsible for its own defence and foreign affairs. But this state of affairs was short-lived. Without British protection the Sultan was soon overthrown by the majority Africans in the Zanzibar Revolution.

== Life in exile ==
Jamshid fled into exile, first to Oman, but was not allowed to settle there permanently. He later moved to the United Kingdom, settling in Portsmouth with his wife and children.

While his children and siblings were allowed to settle in Oman in the 1980s, the Omani government under Sultan Qaboos bin Said continually denied Jamshid's requests to join them, citing security reasons. In September 2020, the new government of Sultan Haitham bin Tariq granted him permission to return to his ancestral land as a member of the Al Bu Said royal family, but not as a titular sultan, after Jamshid had lived more than fifty years in the United Kingdom.

Jamshid died in Muscat on 30 December 2024, at the age of 95. He was buried in the Royal Cemetery in Muscat.

== Honours ==
=== National ===
- Sovereign of the Order of the Brilliant Star of Zanzibar (Wisam al-Kawkab al-Durri al-Zanzibari) – 1 July 1963 (1st class on 30 March 1960)
- Founder and Sovereign of the Most Illustrious Order of Independence of Zanzibar (Wissam al-Istiqlal) in five classes – 9 November 1963

=== Foreign ===
- Honorary Knight Grand Cross of the Order of St Michael and St George (GCMG) – 29 December 1963
- Knight Grand Collar of the Royal Order of the Drum (Rwanda)

Jamshid bin Abdullah House of Al Said Born: 16 September 1929 Died: 30 December 2024
Regnal titles
Preceded by Abdullah bin Khalifa	Sultan of Zanzibar; 1 July 1963 – 12 January 1964	Sultanate abolished Abeid Karume as President of Zanzibar
New title	— TITULAR — Sultan of Zanzibar; 12 January 1964 – 30 December 2024; Reason for succession failure: Sultan's government overthrown in 1964	Succeeded by Sayyid Ali bin Jamshid Al Said
