= Afro-Shirazi Party =

1957–1977 political party in Zanzibar

Afro-Shirazi Party Chama cha Afro-Shirazi
- Leader: Abeid Karume
- Founded: 5 February 1957 (69 years, 44 days)
- Dissolved: 5 February 1977 (49 years, 44 days)
- Merger of: Shiraz Party, Afro Party
- Merged into: Chama cha Mapinduzi
- Headquarters: Zanzibar City
- Youth wing: Afro-Shirazi Youth League
- Ideology: African nationalism Socialism; Pan-Africanism
- Political position: Left-wing to far-left

Party flag

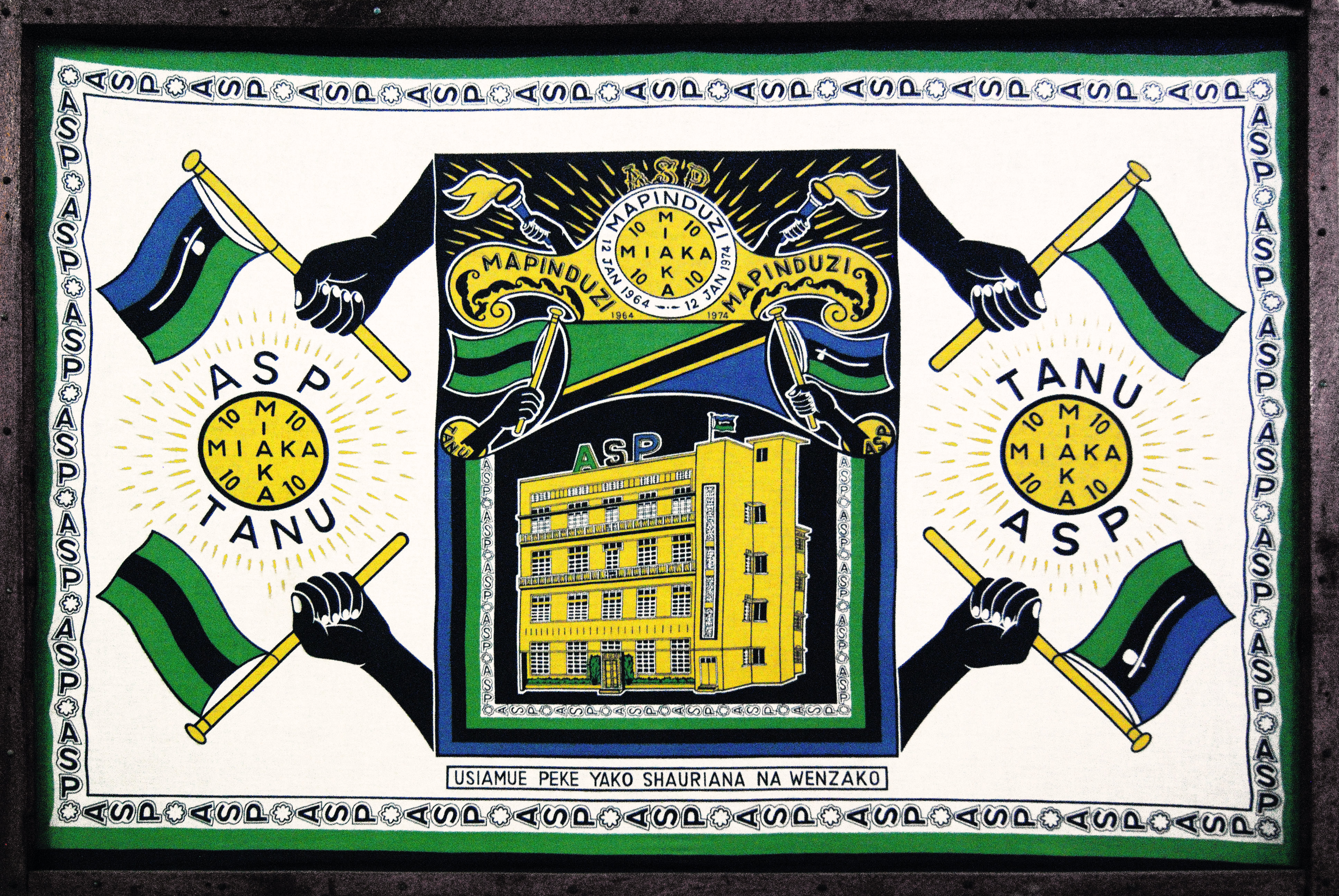
A kanga celebrating TANU and ASP (House of Wonders museum, Stone Town, Zanzibar)

The Afro-Shirazi Party (ASP) was an African nationalist and socialist Zanzibari political party formed between the mostly Shirazi Shiraz Party and the mostly African Afro Party.

In the 1963 Zanzibari general election, the ASP claimed 13 seats and the majority of votes cast, yet the election ended up favouring the Zanzibar Nationalist Party and Zanzibar and Pemba People's Party alliance who collectively claimed 18 seats. Unsatisfied with such unfair representation in parliament, the ASP, headed by Abeid Karume, collaborated with the Umma Party to begin the Zanzibar Revolution on 12 January 1964. The revolution overthrew the Sultanate of Zanzibar and established the People's Republic of Zanzibar, ruled by Abeid Karume. Following the establishment of the republic, the ASP banned the previous ruling parties—the Zanzibar Nationalist Parity and the Zanzibar and Pemba People's Party. On 5 February 1977, the party joined with the Tanganyika African National Union (TANU) to form Chama Cha Mapinduzi (CCM).

== See also ==
- Tanganyika African Association
