= Zanzibar and Pemba People's Party =

Political party in Zanzibar

The Zanzibar and Pemba People's Party (ZPPP) was a nationalist, African-dominated political party in Zanzibar. The ZPPP, in a coalition with the Arab-dominated Zanzibar Nationalist Party (ZNP), governed the island from 1961 to 1964. The ZPPP was originally a breakaway of the ZNP formed by disaffected Shirazis. The party was the smallest of the three political parties on the islands (the third being the Afro-Shirazi Party). By forming an alliance with the ZNP in 1961 they pushed the ASP into opposition. Their politics were moderately conservative and did not bear any major grudges against the Arab elite, mainly due to their base in Pemba as opposed to Zanzibar.
