= Zanzibar Nationalist Party =

Political party in Zanzibar

The Zanzibar Nationalist Party (ZNP) was a nationalist and conservative Arab-dominated political party in Zanzibar. The party platform called for restoration of the sovereignty of Sultanate and local self determination. The ZNP, in a coalition with the African-dominated Zanzibar and Pemba People's Party (ZPPP), governed the island from 1961 to 1964.
