= List of ambassadors of the United States to Sudan =

Ambassador of the United States to Sudan
- سفارة الولايات المتحدة الأميركية فى جمهورية السودان
- Seal of the United States Department of State

- Flag of a United States ambassador

- Incumbent; Jonathan P. Howard; Chargé d'Affairs ad interim since August 12, 2026
- Inaugural holder: Arthur E. Beach as Chargé d'Affaires
- Formation: March 1956
- Website: U.S. Embassy – Khartoum

The following is a list of United States ambassadors to Sudan. The first chief of mission sent by the United States was Arthur E. Beach, who presented his credentials in March 1956. From 1967 to 1972 the embassy was closed, and a U.S. Interest Section was opened in the Netherlands Embassy. In 1973 Ambassador Cleo A. Noel, Jr. was taken hostage and killed by the Black September Organization during the attack on the Saudi embassy in Khartoum. The embassy was again closed in 1996, but reopened in 2002. From 2002 to 2022, the United States posted a sequence of chargés d'affaires ad interim to the country. Ambassador-level representation resumed in 2022 with the appointment of Ambassador John Godfrey, who served until 2024.

== Ambassadors ==
Name	Title	Appointed	Presented credentials	Terminated mission	Notes
Arthur E. Beach – Career FSO	Chargé d'Affaires		March 17, 1956	Superseded, May 17, 1956	The embassy in Khartoum was established Feb 15, 1956, with Beach in charge.
Lowell C. Pinkerton – Career FSO	Ambassador Extraordinary and Plenipotentiary	April 12, 1956	May 17, 1956	August 25, 1957	
James S. Moose, Jr. – Career FSO	Ambassador Extraordinary and Plenipotentiary	March 26, 1958	April 17, 1958	May 5, 1962	
William M. Rountree – Career FSO	Ambassador Extraordinary and Plenipotentiary	July 3, 1962	August 2, 1962	September 17, 1965	
William H. Weathersby – Career FSO	Ambassador Extraordinary and Plenipotentiary	October 20, 1965	December 4, 1965	Sudan severed diplomatic relations with U.S., June 7, 1967; Weathersby left post June 18, 1967.	The embassy in Khartoum was closed as of June 6, 1967. A U.S. Interest Section was established in the Netherlands Embassy on August 14, 1967. Principal officers were: Cleo A. Noel, Jr. (August 1967 – June 1969), and George Curtis Moore (July 1969 – July 1972). The embassy in Khartoum was re-established July 25, 1972, with Moore as chargé d'affaires ad interim.
Cleo A. Noel, Jr. – Career FSO	Ambassador Extraordinary and Plenipotentiary	Dec 2, 1972	Dec 23, 1972	Assassinated at post Mar 2, 1973	
William D. Brewer – Career FSO	Ambassador Extraordinary and Plenipotentiary	Jul 16, 1973	Sep 22, 1973	May 7, 1977	
Donald C. Bergus – Career FSO	Ambassador Extraordinary and Plenipotentiary	May 19, 1977	Jul 19, 1977	Apr 1, 1980	
C. William Kontos – Political appointee	Ambassador Extraordinary and Plenipotentiary	May 23, 1980	Jun 24, 1980	Jul 21, 1983	
Hume Alexander Horan – Career FSO	Ambassador Extraordinary and Plenipotentiary	Jul 6, 1983	Jul 30, 1983	Jul 4, 1986	
G. Norman Anderson – Career FSO	Ambassador Extraordinary and Plenipotentiary	Jun 16, 1986	Aug 12, 1986	Oct 24, 1989	
James Richard Cheek – Career FSO	Ambassador Extraordinary and Plenipotentiary	Oct 10, 1989	Nov 16, 1989	Aug 8, 1992	
Donald K. Petterson – Career FSO	Ambassador Extraordinary and Plenipotentiary	Jun 15, 1992	Aug 24, 1992	Jul 28, 1995	
Timothy Michael Carney – Career FSO	Ambassador Extraordinary and Plenipotentiary	Jun 27, 1995	Sep 9, 1995	November 30, 1997	Embassy Khartoum closed Feb 7, 1996; Ambassador Carney left Nairobi Nov 30, 1997.
Jeffrey Millington	Chargé d'Affaires ad interim	May 23, 2002		August 2003	Embassy Khartoum was reopened May 23, 2002
Gerard M. Gallucci	Chargé d'Affaires ad interim	August 2003		September 2004	
David Kaeuper	Chargé d'Affaires ad interim	February 2005		May 2005	
John Limbert	Chargé d'Affaires ad interim	July 2005		September 2005	
Cameron R. Hume	Chargé d'Affaires ad interim	October 2005		May 2007	
Alberto M. Fernandez	Chargé d'Affaires ad interim	June 2007		May 2009	
Robert E. Whitehead	Chargé d'Affaires ad interim	May 2009		July 2011	
Mary Carlin Yates	Chargé d'Affaires ad interim	September 2011		February 2012	
Joseph D. Stafford III	Chargé d'Affaires ad interim	June 2012		May 13, 2014	
Jerry P. Lanier	Chargé d'Affaires ad interim	May 13, 2014		February 26, 2016	
Steven Koutsis	Chargé d'Affaires ad interim	July 7, 2016		September 10, 2019	
Brian W. Shukan	Chargé d'Affaires ad interim	October 2019		January 2022	
Lucy Tamlyn	Chargé d'Affaires ad interim	February 3, 2022		August 24, 2022	
John Godfrey – Career FSO	Ambassador Extraordinary and Plenipotentiary	July 14, 2022	September 1, 2022	February 23, 2024	
Daniel Rubinstein	Chargé d'Affaires ad interim	February 23, 2024		May 2024	
Colleen Crenwelge	Chargé d'Affaires ad interim	May 2024		August 11, 2026	
Jonathan P. Howard	Chargé d'Affaires ad interim	August 12, 2026		Present	

== See also ==
- Sudan – United States relations
- Foreign relations of Sudan
- Ambassadors of the United States
