= Massacre of Arabs during the Zanzibar Revolution =

1964 mass killing incident in Zanzibar

- Part of the Zanzibar Revolution
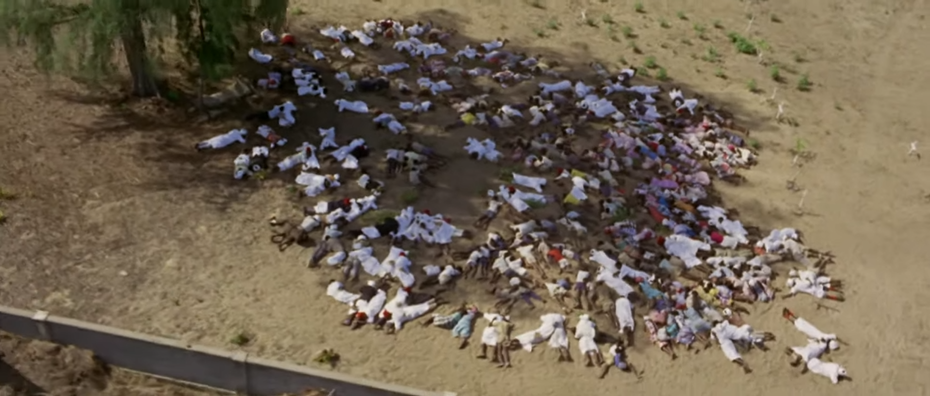
- Scene of Africa Addio showing bodies of Arabs killed in the post-revolution violence
- Location: Sultanate of Zanzibar
- Date: 12 January 1964
- Target: Arab and Indian populations of Zanzibar
- Attack type: Genocide, ethnic cleansing, mass murder, genocidal rape, hate crime
- Deaths: Uncertain, probably at least several thousand
- Victims: 100,000 deported (Ali Muhsin claim)
- Perpetrator: Black African rebel militiamen
- Motive: Anti-Arab racism

In January 1964, during and following the Zanzibar Revolution, Arab residents of Zanzibar were victims of targeted violence committed by the island’s majority Black African population. Arabs were mass murdered, raped, tortured and deported from the island by Black African militiamen under the Afro-Shirazi Party and Umma Party. The exact death toll is unknown, although scholarly sources generally estimate the number of Arabs killed to be at least several thousand, a significant fraction of the total Arab population. It has been described by some, including a number of scholars, as an act of genocide.

Omani and Arab elites had dominated the society of the island for more than two hundred years, both politically and economically. The uprising against the ethnic Arabs (and Indians) has been overlooked by the majority and the massacres remain largely undiscussed and outside the public eye in terms of official histories. The Zanzibar Revolution is publicly celebrated on its anniversary as an uprising against slavery and oppression, although slavery in Zanzibar had already been abolished 55 years prior. In the 21st-century, the massacres are either downplayed or not discussed at all within Zanzibar.

== Background ==
Arab settlement in Zanzibar began more than 1,000 years ago, when traders came to the island. Due to the increase of European imperialism in the region, Zanzibar became a colonial possession of the Portuguese Empire for more than two centuries, beginning in the 16th century. Zanzibari elites invited the Omani Empire to help them drive out the colonizing Portuguese forces and overlords. The Omani and Arab forces, led by Imam Saif bin Sultan, successfully ousted Portuguese rule in Zanzibar and established political authority in the islands. By the 19th century, Zanzibar had become an Omani-led sultanate ruled by an Omani Sultan and a largely Omani and Arab ruling class.

Although Slavery in Zanzibar had been abolished in 1897, the legacy of the Indian Ocean slave trade (due to many elders being brought as slaves themselves) continued to influence social relations. Although there were multiple efforts by the sultanate to show some avenues for mobility, two of the six governors appointed before 1840 were themselves freed slaves—reflecting on Islamic legal traditions that permitted enslaved individuals to obtain freedom through repayment contracts (Mukataba) or Manumission (as a mean of Kaffara), some of the Arab elite who dominated the island's politics held racist views of the Swahili majority. In one notable Parliamentary exchange between then Minister of Finance, Juma Aley, and Leader of the opposition (later President of Zanzibar), Abeid Karume, Aley insultingly replied he need not answer questions from a mere "boatman". The government did not help broaden its appeal either to the Black majority as there were circulating rumors and allegations of the introducing budget cuts to schools located in Swahili and Black neighborhoods which was presented as a sign that the Arab-dominated government was planning to lock them in a permanent second-class status. These allegations remain disputed until this day.

By the time of the Zanzibar Revolution, the island had a population of about 300,000 people, including around 230,000 Black Africans (incl. indigenous Swahilis), around 50,000 Arabs and around 20,000 Asians (mostly Indians). In addition, several hundred Comorians (incl. Mahorans) were killed during the pogrom as they were associated with Muslim Arabs and Zanzibar Nationalist Party (ZNP). In 1948, the Comorian community in Zanzibar numbered 3,267 (roughly 1.2% of the total population) but, after the revolution, the number dwindled to barely a few hundred as a result of ethnic cleansing and forced assimilation. An unknown number of Comorian-Zanzibaris survived by hiding their heritage and eventually assimilated into the post-revolution Swahili-African population. The once thriving communities of Parsis and Malagasy in Zanzibar also came to an abrupt end as the vast majority were driven out or otherwise fled the archipelago during this time.

The Zanzibar Revolution was inspired by John Okello, an African preacher from Uganda who belonged to the small Christian minority of Zanzibar. His Christianity held little appeal to the largely Muslim African population of Zanzibar, so he found racial hatred a more effective way to motivate people to his side. The revolution was led by the Afro-Shirazi Party and the Umma Party. The Afro-Shirazi Party was Pan-Africanist and attempted to unite the Shirazi people with mainland Africans, whereas the Umma Party was small, Arab-dominated and Marxist.

== Massacre ==
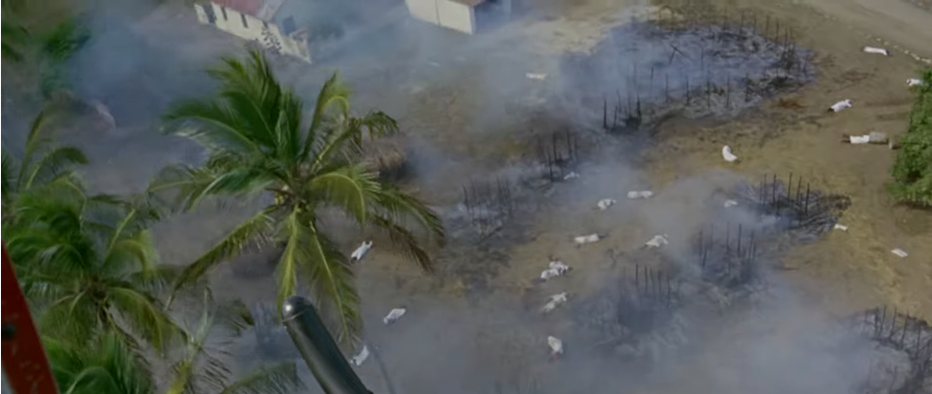
A burnt Arab village along with dead bodies in Zanzibar seen in Africa Addio

American diplomat Donald Petterson described the killings of Arabs by the African majority as an act of genocide, and wrote "Genocide was not a term that was as much in vogue then, as it came to be later, but it is fair to say that in parts of Zanzibar, the killing of Arabs was genocide, pure and simple". It was the largest outbreak of anti-Arab violence in Africa's postcolonial history. Since the early 19th century, all of the island's wealthiest and most privileged residents had been Arab or South Asian. After a decade of revolutionary politics, they and their less wealthy relatives were killed, forced to emigrate or reduced to poverty.

The leaders of the Zanzibar Revolution encouraged Black African militiamen to attack non-Blacks, leading to a massacre. Thousands of unarmed Arab civilians were murdered. Motivated by racial hatred and promises of wealth and women, enraged African militiamen went from house to house, murdering, torturing, and raping every Arab they could lay their hands on. Bloody corpses filled the streets of Zanzibar, with cases of mutilated bodies. Many Indian shops were looted and burned, and some Indians were killed. Arab properties were expropriated. Following the targeted slaughter, thousands more were put in camps and later forcibly deported. Homes were invaded and people of lighter skin were targeted for extermination, often in a brutal manner, to the point that no body could remain for burial. Allegedly, Okello bragged that he personally killed over 8,000 people. The killing of Arab prisoners, their burial in mass graves, forced marches and executions were documented by an Italian crew, filming from a helicopter, for Africa Addio, and this sequence of the film contained the only known visual document of the killings. The film was initially banned in Zanzibar, but it has become well-known in recent time and has polarised opinion, with some seeing it as an archive of what happened and others (often those involved in the revolution) claiming that the footage was staged or exaggerated. Thousands fled Zanzibar, although many were unable to leave and forced to "live in the shadow, seeking more to make themselves forgotten than to recapture lost advantages". The rebel gangs specifically targeted Zanzibar's Islamic heritage. Most of the Arabic manuscripts in the Zanzibar National Archives have been vandalized. Qur'ans and other Islamic books were burned in the streets, despite 98 percent of Zanzibar's population being Muslim.

== Death toll ==
It has been stated that "No reliable information is available for the number of Arabs massacred.", and that "Mostly, scholars are in agreement that the “precise numbers” of the victims of the revolution are, “unknown"" with estimates varying “from a few dozens to about 14,000.”, though it is thought that at least several thousand Arabs were probably killed. Historian Jonathan Glassman estimated that Zanzibar lost a quarter or more of its Arab population by the end of 1964 due to expulsion, flight or mass murder. Leo Kuper reported that Zanzibar revolutionary John Okello claimed that 11,995 "enemies" (including opponent soldiers) were killed and 21,462 detained, while Abdullahi Ali Ibrahim reported Okello as saying that there were 7994 Arab and 1417 African victims of the revolution. American diplomat Donald K. Petterson, who was in Zanzibar at the time of the revolution, estimated that around 5,000 people were killed, mostly Arabs. Ali Muhsin, the ousted prime minister, estimated that 26,000 Arabs were detained and 100,000 were forcibly deported. Seif Sharif Hamad, a member of the new revolutionary government of Zanzibar, said that he had been told that over 13,000, mostly Arabs, were killed. Some sources give figures of around 20,000 for the number of Arab victims.

== See also ==
- List of genocides
- Genocides in history (1946 to 1999)
