= Donald C. Bergus =

American diplomat (1920–1998)

- Born: February 26, 1920; South Bend, Indiana
- Died: April 12, 1998 (aged 78)

Donald Clayton Bergus (February 26, 1920 – April 12, 1998) was a US career diplomat and expert on south-west Asia.

Born on February 26, 1920, in South Bend, Indiana, to George and Grace Bergus, Donald then went on to study Law at the University of Chicago. In 1942, Donald was appointed to the Foreign Service, beginning his 40-year-long service, and initially sent to Baghdad.

In 1967, as the Egyptian government severed diplomatic relations with the US government, Bergus was appointed to represent his country's interests in Cairo by managing the US Interests Section from the Spanish embassy. He held that position until February 1972, when succeeded by Joseph Nathaniel Greene. From 1977 to 1980, he served as US Ambassador to Sudan.

Donald died in 1998 leaving behind his wife, Elizabeth R Bergus, and his three grown children.

Diplomatic posts
Preceded by William D. Brewer	United States Ambassador to Sudan; 1977–1980	Succeeded by C. William Kontos
