= Sudan–United States relations =

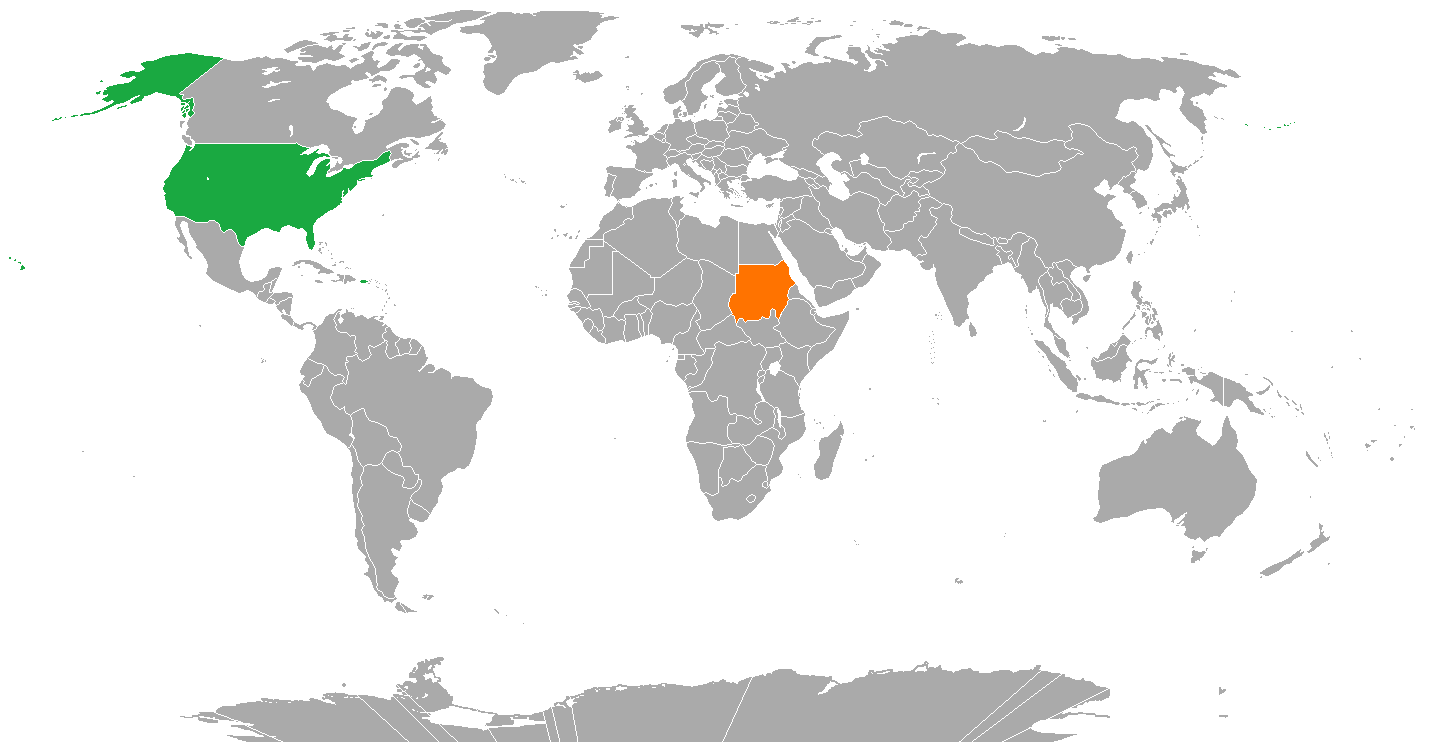

- United States: Sudan

Diplomatic mission
- U.S. Embassy, Khartoum (operations suspended): Embassy of Sudan, Washington, D.C.

Envoy
- Chargé d'affaires Colleen Crenwelge: Ambassador Mohamed Abdalla Idris

Sudan–United States relations are the bilateral relations between Sudan and the United States. The United States government has been critical of Sudan's human rights record and has dispatched a strong UN Peacekeeping force to Darfur. Relations between both countries in recent years have greatly improved, with Sudan's post-revolutionary government compensating American victims of al-Qaeda terror attacks, the removal of Sudan from the State Department's blacklist of state sponsors of terrorism and the United States Congress having reinstated Sudan's sovereign immunity in December 2020.

== History ==
The United States established diplomatic relations with Sudan in 1956, following its independence from joint administration by Egypt and the United Kingdom. After the outbreak of the Six-Day War in June 1967, Sudan declared war on Israel and broke diplomatic relations with the U.S. Relations improved after July 1971, when the Sudanese Communist Party attempted to overthrow President Nimeiry, and Nimeiry suspected Soviet involvement. Relations improved further after the U.S. provided assistance for the resettlement of refugees following the 1972 peace settlement that ended the First Sudanese Civil War with the south. Sudan and the United States reestablished diplomatic relations in 1972.

On 1 March 1973, Palestinian terrorists of the Black September organization murdered U.S. Ambassador Cleo A. Noel and Deputy Chief of Mission Curtis G. Moore in Khartoum. Sudanese officials arrested the terrorists and tried them on murder charges. In June 1974, however, they were released to the custody of the Egyptian government. The U.S. Ambassador to Sudan was withdrawn in protest. Although the U.S. Ambassador returned to Khartoum in November, relations with Sudan remained static until early 1976, when President Nimeiri mediated the release of 10 American hostages being held by Eritrean insurgents in rebel strongholds in northern Ethiopia. In 1976, the U.S. resumed economic assistance to Sudan.

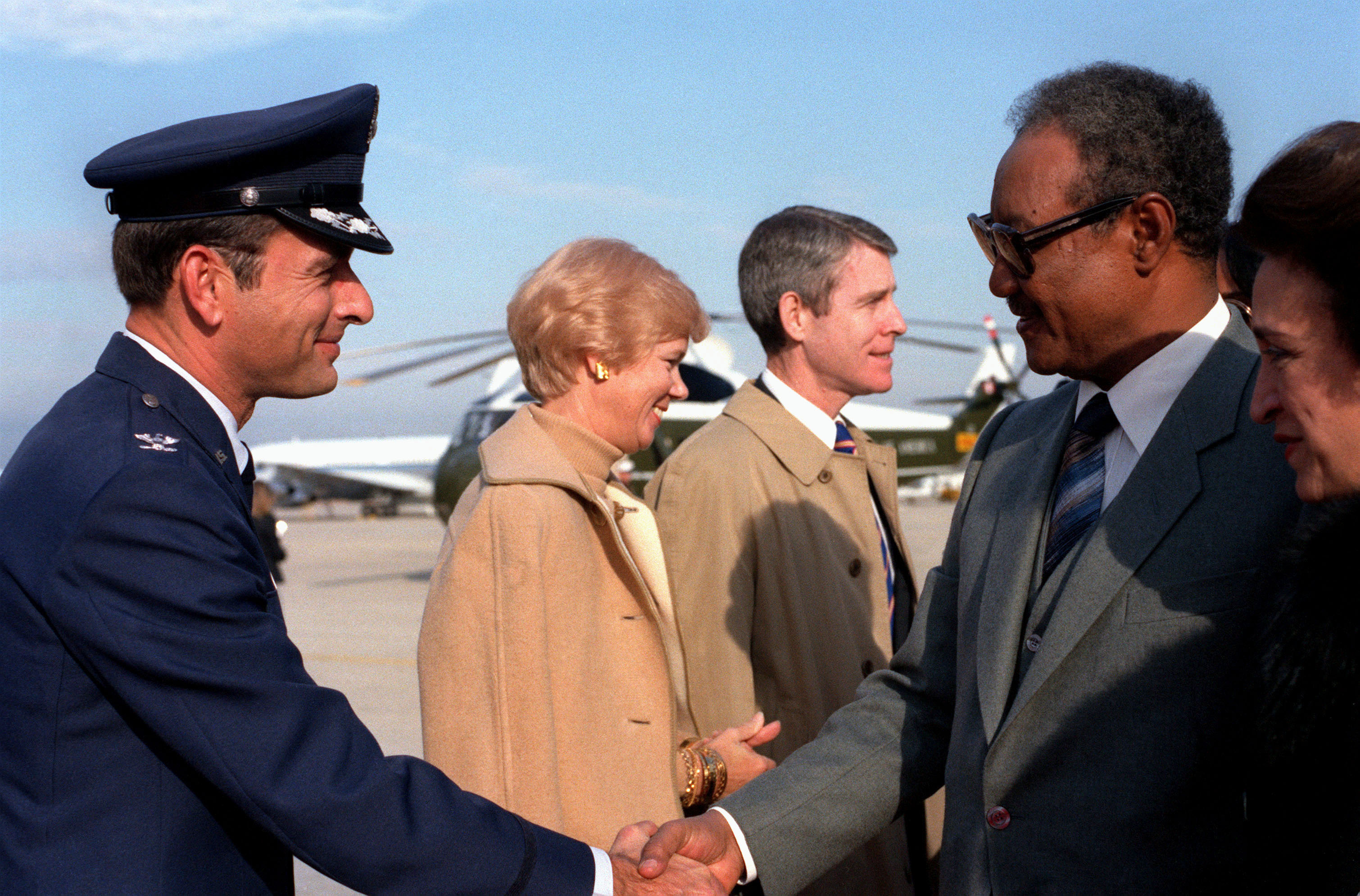
Jaafar Nimeiry arriving on a state visit to the United States, 1983

The United States went from an unusually important and close relationship with Sudan in the early 1980s to one that began to deteriorate near the end of the Nimeiry government.

In late 1985, there was a reduction in staff at the U.S. Embassy in Khartoum because of the presence of a large contingent of Libyan terrorists. In April 1986, relations with Sudan deteriorated when the U.S. bombed Tripoli, Libya. A U.S. Embassy employee was shot on 16 April 1986. Immediately following this incident, all non-essential personnel and all dependents left for six months. At this time, Sudan was the single largest recipient of U.S. development and military assistance in sub-Saharan Africa.

=== Presidency of Omar al-Bashir ===
Relations between the countries declined quickly following the 1989 military coup and the rise of Islamist leaders in Sudan's government. Sudanese support for Iraq during the 1990–91 Gulf War helped ensure the downturn. The United States, pushed by domestic interest groups such as evangelical Christians and the Congressional Black Caucus, expressed outspoken unhappiness over Khartoum's handling of the war with the SPLM/A, the human-rights situation, including alleged government support for slavery, and its welcoming environment toward international terrorist groups. Washington put Sudan on its list of state supporters of terrorism in 1993, an action that resulted in additional U.S. sanctions against Sudan.

The administration of President Bill Clinton subsequently worked to isolate Sudan. During the mid-1990s, it instituted a Front Line States policy of pressure against Khartoum with the assistance of Uganda, Ethiopia, and Eritrea. Growing unhappiness over Sudan's policies and terrorist threat information aimed at Americans in Sudan, much of which turned out to be false, caused the United States in the spring of 1996 to relocate all Americans from the embassy in Khartoum to the U.S. Embassy in Nairobi. The embassy in Khartoum remained open but staffed by Sudanese and occasional Americans visiting from Kenya. At the urging of the United States, Sudan forced Osama bin Laden to leave the country in May 1996, but Washington did not follow this development by trying to improve ties with Sudan. The low point in relations occurred in August 1998, just days after the bombing of the American embassies in Dar es Salaam, Tanzania, and Nairobi, Kenya, when a U.S. naval vessel launched cruise missiles against the Al-Shifa pharmaceutical factory in Khartoum on the questionable grounds that it was linked to the production of chemical weapons.

At the end of the Clinton administration, the United States opened a dialogue with Sudan on counterterrorism, and Sudan was receptive. The George W. Bush administration generally continued a tough policy toward Sudan, but the events of 11 September, 2001, had a dramatic impact on the relationship. The United States moved counterterrorism to the highest foreign-policy priority, and Sudan, taking advantage of this new situation, stepped up its counterterrorism cooperation with the United States. President Bush nominated former Senator John Danforth as his special envoy for Sudan in 2001. Danforth focused on ending the Sudanese civil war, but the U.S. Congress and the evangelical community remained highly critical of Sudan. The United States pursued a policy of carrots and sticks. In October 2002, President Bush signed the congressionally initiated Sudan Peace Act, which provided for punitive financial and diplomatic steps against Sudan if Washington concluded that Khartoum was acting in bad faith at the peace talks. At the same time, Sudan offered significant cooperation on counterterrorism, a response appreciated in Washington.

The United States, working with IGAD, Britain, and Norway, played a key role in bringing the civil war in Sudan to an end. While this development had the potential to significantly improve Sudanese–American relations, Sudan's botched handling of the crisis in Darfur that began in 2003 set back relations with Washington. In 2006, under pressure from Congress and domestic interest groups, the Bush administration named another special envoy for Sudan, Andrew Natsios, who resigned at the end of 2007 and was replaced by former diplomat Richard S. Williamson. The United States took the lead in requesting the UN Security Council to impose additional international sanctions against Sudan. Failing to convince the UN to institute broader sanctions, President Bush signed a bill at the end of 2007 that allowed state and local governments to cut investment ties with companies doing business with Sudan. At the same time, the United States committed US$2.7 billion in fiscal years 2005–6 for humanitarian assistance, peacekeeping in Darfur, implementation of the CPA, and reconstruction and development in South Sudan. Khartoum continued to cooperate with the United States on counterterrorism. The United States also was the single largest holder—in the amount of US$1.5 billion—of Sudanese debt. The United States supported full implementation of the CPA and the Darfur Peace Agreement and rapid deployment of more than 20,000 additional peacekeepers to Darfur.

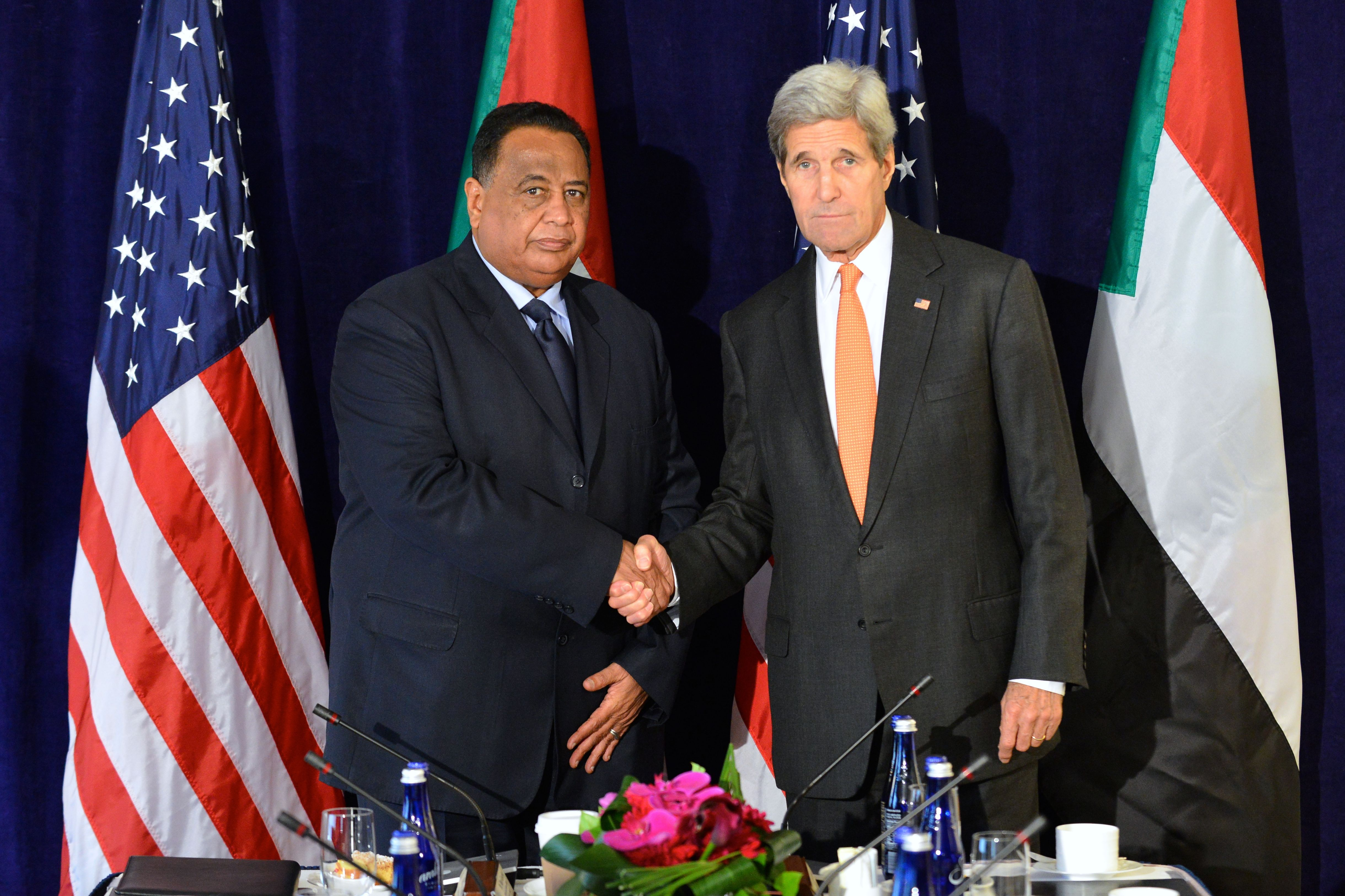
U.S. Secretary of State John Kerry with Sudanese Foreign Minister Ibrahim Ghandour, 2015

The situation in Darfur dominated the United States–Sudan relationship until early in the administration of President Barack H. Obama. Obama named Scott Gration as the new special envoy for Sudan. He changed the tone of the dialogue with the government in Khartoum and began contact with Darfur's highly fragmented rebel movements. He also concluded that the United States must give at least as much attention to successful implementation of the CPA as to resolution of the crisis in Darfur. He favored engagement with Khartoum over confrontation and proposed a policy of engagement that included rewards and penalties. Gration's policy had support in the White House but detractors elsewhere in the U.S. government and some harsh critics on Capitol Hill and in the “Save Darfur Coalition” community. Late in 2010, the United States spelled out the conditions for the normalization of ties with Sudan. They included full implementation of the CPA and the holding of a referendum on the future of South Sudan in January 2011. The United States significantly increased the number of personnel devoted to an effort to assure this outcome. Washington also noted that there must be peace and accountability in Darfur.

In 2016, the National Security Council Director for African Affairs, Marc Gustafson, developed the Five Track Plan, which was a one-year diplomatic effort to lift sanctions from Sudan in exchange for a series of steps related to humanitarian aid, capturing Joseph Kony, ending conflict with South Sudan, improving counter-terrorism cooperation, and ending hostilities in Darfur. The Sudanese and the United States completed all of the tracks successfully only weeks before the end of Obama's presidency. On 13 January 2017, the U.S. lifted economic and trade sanctions on Sudan after the Sudanese Government met all the objectives. The White House announced the easing of sanctions as part of a five-track engagement process. On 16 March 2017, the U.S. and Sudan announced the resumption of military relations after exchanging military attachés. In April 2017, it was announced that the U.S. Central Intelligence Agency (CIA), which was “especially keen to see sanctions lifted“, had decided to open a large office in Khartoum. Sudan was also removed from the list of Muslim-majority countries on the American travel ban. On 6 October 2017, the U.S. permanently lifted all 1997 sanctions after Sudan cut all ties with the North Korean regime of Kim Jong Un.

=== Post Al-Bashir ===
Al-Bashir was deposed as Sudan's president in a coup d'état in April 2019. In September 2019, Sudan's new prime minister, Abdalla Hamdok, said that he held useful talks with U.S. officials while at the United Nations, and expressed hope Khartoum could “very soon" be removed from the U.S. state sponsor of terrorism list. In December 2019, U.S. Secretary of State Mike Pompeo stated that the U.S. and Sudan are to begin exchanging ambassadors after 23 years of no diplomatic relations. That same month, Hamdok became the first Sudanese leader to visit Washington D.C. since 1985.

The last U.S. Ambassador was Tim Carney, who left the post on 30 November 1997. Also in December, it was reported that the Sudanese transitional government will close the offices of Hamas, Hezbollah, and any other Islamic group designated as terrorist by the U.S.

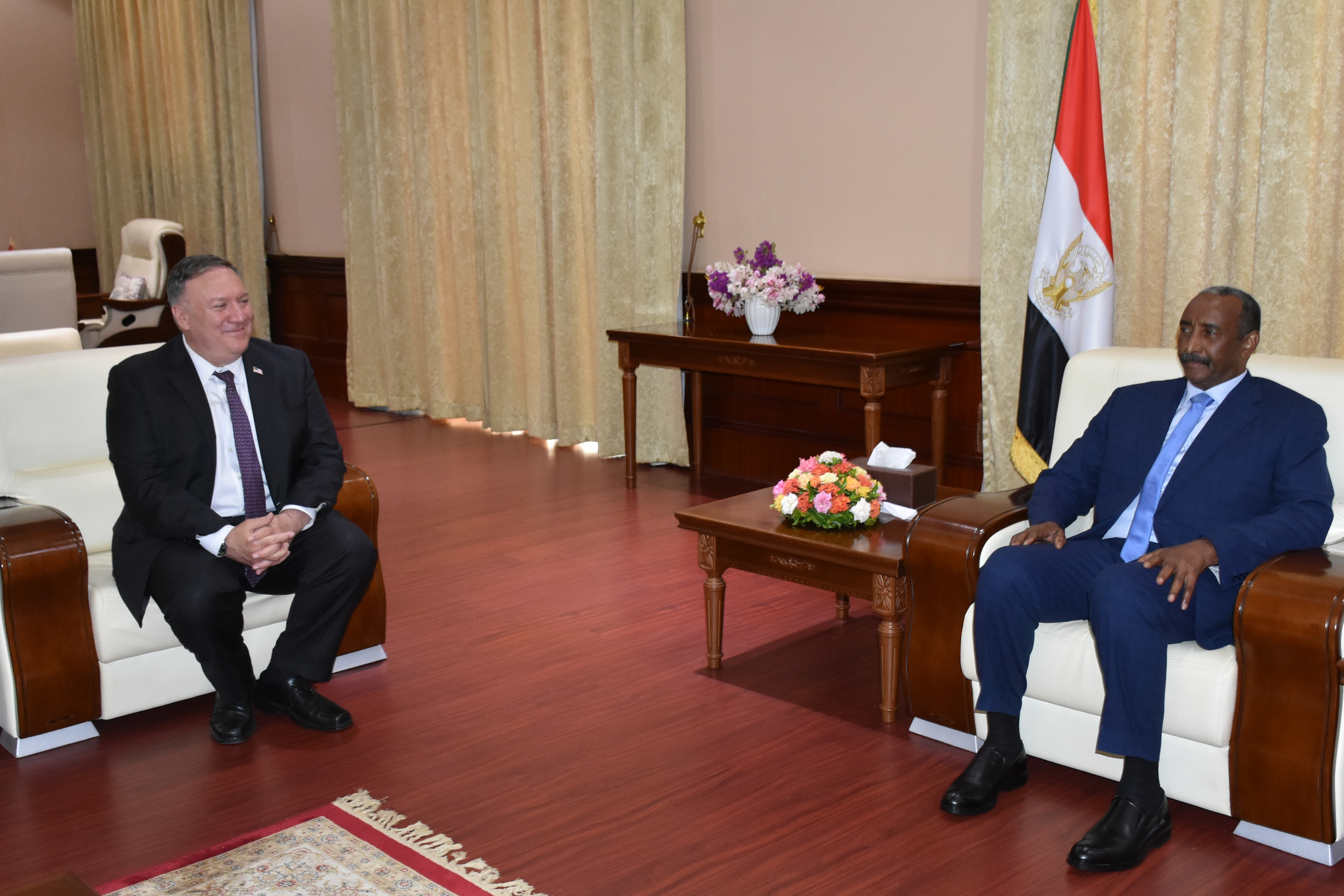
Secretary of State Michael R. Pompeo meets with Sudanese Sovereign Council Chair General Abdel Fattah al-Burhan, in Khartoum, on 25 August 2020.

As of June 2019, the office of U.S. Ambassador to Sudan was vacant. The Chargé d’Affaires was Steven Koutsis and the Deputy Chief of Mission was Ellen B. Thorburn.

On 5 May 2020, Sudan appointed Noureldin Sati, a veteran diplomat, as ambassador.

In August 2020, Mike Pompeo became the first US secretary of state to visit Sudan since Condoleezza Rice in 2005. (Note: In 2005, Condoleezza Rice met President Omar al-Bashir in Khartoum, then she visited Abu Shouk camp for the internally displaced people, near Al Fashir in northern Darfur.) The visit came on the heels of the Israel–United Arab Emirates peace agreement. His visit was meant to discuss the possibility of opening relations between Sudan and Israel and exhibit assistance and support for Sudan's shift to democracy.

On 19 October 2020, President Donald Trump announced that he would lift the designation of Sudan as a state sponsor of terrorism once $335 million in compensation from Sudan to American families victims of terrorism was deposited into an escrow account. On 23 October 2020, President Donald Trump officially notified the Congress of his intention to remove Sudan from the State Department's blacklist of state sponsors of terrorism.

On 14 December 2020, the United States officially removed Sudan from the list after it agreed to establish relations with Israel.

On 6 January 2021, U.S. Treasury Secretary Steven Mnuchin signed a memorandum of understanding with Sudanese Acting Finance Minister Heba Mohamed Ali, in order to clear Sudan's arrears with the World Bank, and to allow their access to more than US$1 billion in annual lending.

On 1 March 2021, Sudanese officials welcomed the missile guided destroyer USS Winston S. Churchill at Port Sudan, the first time in decades that the U.S. naval forces had visited the country. The commander of Sudan’s naval forces, Alnairi Hassan, described the visit as a momentous occasion and said Sudan was happy to receive the U.S. warship.

On 25 October 2021, the Sudanese military, led by General Abdel Fattah al-Burhan overthrew the government and detained Prime Minister Abdalla Hamdok. The United States condemned the coup, called for Hamdok's release and suspended $700 million in aid to Sudan. Hamdok was reinstated as Prime Minister on 21 November; the move was welcomed by the United States.

In April 2023, after a lot of fighting between the regular military and the RSF, the United States and other countries have evacuated their diplomats and citizens.

=== Donald Trump's 2nd presidency ===
In March 2025, reports emerged that the United States and Israel had discussed with Sudan, Somalia, and Somaliland the possibility of forcibly relocating Palestinians from Gaza to these East African regions. This initiative, which was initiated following US President Donald Trump’s proposal to displace Palestinians, was rejected by Sudanese officials, while Somalia and Somaliland denied any involvement. The proposal included incentives like financial, diplomatic, and security support in exchange for resettlement. This plan sparked international backlash, with critics condemning it as ethnic cleansing.

In November 2025, Secretary of State Marco Rubio called for international action to stop the flow of weapons to the Rapid Support Forces (RSF), the paramilitary group responsible for mass killings and atrocities in El Fasher and across Sudan's Darfur region. He emphasized that the U.S. knows which countries are involved in supplying the RSF and using their territories for transit, and that pressure is being applied at the highest levels to stop this aid. The United Arab Emirates (UAE) is widely accused by various sources, including the Sudanese army and U.N. investigators, of being the RSF's main foreign backer.

== U.S. aid ==
Despite policy disagreements, the U.S. has been a major donor of humanitarian aid to Sudan throughout the last quarter of the 20th century. The U.S. provided assistance for resettlement of refugees following the 1972 peace settlement that brought the First Sudanese Civil War with the south to an end. The U.S. was also a significant source of aid in the March 1989 "Operation Lifeline Sudan," which delivered 100,000 metric tons of food into both government and SPLA-held areas of Sudan, averting widespread starvation. In 1991, the U.S. made large donations to alleviate food shortages caused by a two-year drought. In October 1997, the U.S. imposed comprehensive economic, trade, and financial sanctions against Sudan. However, during another drought in 2000–01, the U.S. and the broader international community responded to avert mass starvation in Sudan. In 2001, the Bush Administration named a Presidential Envoy for Peace in Sudan to explore what role the U.S. could play in ending Sudan's civil war and enhancing the delivery of humanitarian aid. For fiscal years 2005–2006, the U.S. committed almost $2.6 billion to Sudan for humanitarian assistance and peacekeeping in Darfur as well as support for the implementation of the peace accord and reconstruction and development in southern Sudan.

== U.S. sanctions ==
Sudan was added to the State Sponsors of Terrorism list on 12 August 1993, alleging that Sudan harbored members of the Abu Nidal Organization, Hezbollah, and Islamic Jihad. In 1998, the Al-Shifa pharmaceutical factory in Khartoum was destroyed by a missile attack launched by the United States government, killing one employee and wounding eleven. The U.S. government claimed that the factory was used for the processing of VX nerve agent and that the owners of the plant had ties to the terrorist group al-Qaeda. These justifications for the bombing, however, were disputed by the owners of the plant, the Sudanese government, and other governments.

In response to Sudan's continued complicity of hunger in unabated violence in Darfur, U.S. President George W. Bush imposed new economic sanctions on Sudan in May 2007.

President Barack Obama sent Special Envoy Scott Gration to Sudan to improve diplomatic conditions, and discuss ways to avert the Darfur conflict. On 9 September 2009, the U.S. published a new law to ease sanctions on parts of Sudan.

On 9 July 2011, the United States officially recognized the independence from Sudan of South Sudan.

On 28 August 2013, Obama named Donald E. Booth Special Envoy for Sudan and South Sudan. Booth served as the US Envoy until 2017. He led the U.S. government's effort to "normalize relations" with the regime in Sudan and worked to make it easier for Sudan to comply with U.S. requirements to lift sanctions.

On 10 June 2019, President Donald Trump re-appointed Booth as Special Envoy for Sudan. In October 2020, Trump announced that the US would remove Sudan from the State Sponsors of Terrorism list after Sudan had agreed to pay $335 million in compensation to the families of victims of the 1998 United States embassy bombings. Sudan was officially removed from the list on 14 December 2020.

== See also ==
- Embassy of Sudan in Washington, D.C.
- CIA activities in Sudan
