= Timothy M. Carney =

American diplomat (1944–2026)

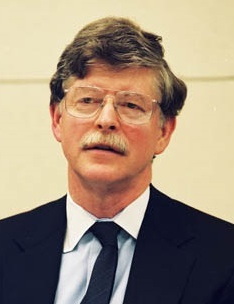

45th United States Ambassador to Haiti
- In office January 14, 1998 – December 11, 1999
- President: Bill Clinton
- Preceded by: William L. Swing
- Succeeded by: Brian D. Curran

14th United States Ambassador to Sudan
- In office June 27, 1995 – November 30, 1997
- President: Bill Clinton
- Preceded by: Donald K. Petterson
- Succeeded by: Robert E. Whitehead (acting)

Personal details
- Born: Timothy Michael Carney; July 12, 1944 St. Joseph, Missouri, U.S.
- Died: August 10, 2026 (aged 82) Cambridge, Massachusetts, U.S.
- Spouse: Victoria Butler
- Children: 1 daughter
- Education: M.I.T., B.S. degree, 1966; Cornell University, 1975-76; Southeast Asian Studies
- Profession: Career U.S. Diplomat; Democracy Projects (Haiti); Consultant

Timothy Michael Carney (July 12, 1944 – August 10, 2026) was an American diplomat and consultant. Carney served as a career Foreign Service Officer for 32 years, with assignments that included Vietnam and Cambodia as well as Lesotho and South Africa before being appointed ambassador to Sudan and later in Haiti. Carney served with a number of U.N. Peacekeeping Missions, and until recently led the Haiti Democracy Project, an initiative launched under the presidency of George W. Bush to build stronger institutional foundations for the country's long-term relationship with the United States.

In 2003, Carney was appointed to oversee America's reconstruction efforts in Iraq after the war that deposed Saddam Hussein. After a long diplomatic career, Carney served as Executive Vice President of the Clinton Bush Haiti Fund, a non-profit organization whose principal purpose was to assist Haiti's redevelopment in the aftermath of the January 2010 earthquake until the Fund rolled over operations in December 2012 to a domestic Haitian non-profit organization.

Carney's appointment to diplomatic postings in countries that had often difficult relations with the United States earned him both praise and criticism from observers for his hands-on diplomatic style. His strong views on Iraq's reconstruction efforts after the war in 2003 were in part responsible for a wholesale change in the Bush administration's strategy to stabilize the war-torn nation. He also advocated engagement with Sudan at a time when White House officials and the C.I.A. wanted the U.S. Embassy closed in Khartoum.

== Background ==
Carney was born in St. Joseph, Missouri, on July 12, 1944. He was raised and educated at military posts in the U.S. as well as abroad where his parents were stationed, including in Bad Tölz, Germany, Fort Bliss, Texas, and Taipei, Taiwan. His father served in the United States Army in the early 1940s before being assigned to the Judge Advocate Generals Corps in 1948. His mother, daughter of a surgeon in St. Joseph, raised Carney and his two siblings as the family moved from one military posting to another. He received his Bachelor of Science degree from the Massachusetts Institute of Technology in 1966 and the U.S. Foreign Service sent him on a brief sabbatical to study at Cornell University from 1975 until 1976, focusing on Southeast Asian studies as part of his career. Carney was a member of the board of the American Academy of Diplomacy and spoke Khmer, Thai and French fluently.

He was married to a free-lance journalist, Victoria Butler. Carney had a daughter from a previous marriage. He and his wife, both writers, published, with a British photographer, a photographic essay on the Sudan.

Carney died from esophageal cancer in Cambridge, Massachusetts, on August 10, 2026, at the age of 82.

== Foreign Service career ==
=== Early assignments ===
Carney began his Foreign Service Officer career in Vietnam in 1967 as a rotation officer based in Saigon for biographic and youth affairs and for commercial matters. He was then stationed in Lesotho as second of two officers in charge of consular, political and economic affairs until 1971. In 1972, he was appointed Second Secretary at the U.S. Mission in Phnom Penh, before returning to the United States to study at Cornell University in 1975.

After spending a few years at the State Department's Vietnam, Laos and Cambodia desk, Carney was appointed as U.S. consul in Udorn, Thailand, and later as political officer in Bangkok during the Third Indochina War from 1979 until 1983. After serving three year stints as the political counselor to U.S. Missions in Jakarta, Indonesia and Pretoria, South Africa (before Apartheid ended), Carney joined the U.S. Mission to the UN as political adviser for the 1989 UN General Assembly. On return to Washington he joined the White House National Security Council staff under President George H. W. Bush. He focused on Southeast Asian and Pacific Island affairs.

Carney cycled through several United Nations positions during the 1990s, serving from 1992 to 1993 as the Director of Information and Education of the UN Transitional Authority in Cambodia, in 1993 as the Special Political Adviser to the Special Representative of the UN Secretary General in Somalia, and in 1994 in the UN Observer Mission in South Africa as it prepared for the historic post-Apartheid transition to democracy in 1994. In 1994, Carney was appointed as Deputy Assistant Secretary of State for South Asian Affairs. A year later, he would receive his first ambassadorial posting.

=== U.S. Ambassador to Sudan ===
Carney was appointed U.S. Ambassador to Sudan on 27 June 1995 during a period of turmoil in U.S.-Sudan relations. Osama bin Laden had fled Saudi Arabia for the safe confines of Khartoum a few years earlier, and Sudan's alleged harboring and abetting of Muslim extremists on its soil was attracting attention of counterterrorism experts in the United States and abroad. Carney's tenure as ambassador followed a tumultuous period during which his predecessor, Donald K. Petterson, had been forced to draw down embassy staff by half and send their families back to America when terrorist threats were made against U.S. diplomats stationed in Khartoum.

In late 1993, Petterson was asked by officials in the Clinton administration to deliver a "non-paper" ultimatum to Sudan's Islamist leader, Hasan al-Turabi, and the country's president, Omar al-Bashir. The document contained a brief list of talking points that were designed to warn Sudan's top government officials about any involvement in alleged plots to kill U.S. diplomats working in Sudan. The alleged threats were based on evidence gathered by a foreign agent retained by the C.I.A., data which would be used to justify Petterson's reduction of American embassy personnel in Khartoum. The agent's information would later be found to have been fabricated, and would force the C.I.A. to redact or delete up to 100 reports on Sudan. Petterson would later state that he did not believe the intelligence findings warranted a draw down in embassy staff.

Petterson's compulsory delivery of the talking points based on faulty U.S. intelligence would set the stage for strained relations between Washington and Khartoum that lasted well into Carney's early tenure as ambassador. In late 1995, Carney was also asked to deliver a similar non-paper message based on what he would later recount as having been poorly sourced U.S. intelligence.

In early 1996, a few months after his credentials had been accepted, Carney met with senior Sudanese foreign ministry officials prior to vacating the U.S. embassy in Khartoum for the safer environs of Nairobi. He proposed tangible steps to recover the rapidly deteriorating relationship between Washington and Khartoum. In March 1996, El Fatih Erwa, then minister of state for defense, was authorized by President Omar al-Bashir to make several secret trips to the United States to hold talks with U.S. officials, including Carney and senior C.I.A. Africa experts, about U.S. sanctions policy against Sudan and what measures might be taken by the Bashir regime to lift them.

During a series of meetings in northern Virginia, Erwa was presented with a list of U.S. requirements, including demands for information about bin Laden and other radical Islamic groups encamped in Sudan. The U.S. also demanded that the Bashir regime stop hosting the Popular Arab and Islamic Congress conferences that were increasingly perceived in the west as global terrorist planning sessions. Carney argued with State Department, C.I.A. and other U.S. officials, including Susan Rice, then the National Security Council's Africa Director, that Sudan's Mukhabarat (equivalent of the C.I.A.) was amassing volumes of valuable intelligence on Islamist leaders through their pilgrimages to Khartoum for the PAIC conferences. In May 1996, despite Carney's efforts to persuade U.S. officials to reconcile with Khartoum on intelligence matters, the Clinton Administration demanded that Sudan expel bin Laden. The Saudi fugitive fled to Afghanistan. Carney was relegated to shuttling from Nairobi to Khartoum to engage in his ambassadorial duties. Carney ended his post as ambassador in November 1997 to move to Haiti.

=== U.S. Ambassador to Haiti ===
Carney arrived as U.S. Ambassador to Haiti on January 14, 1998. At the time of his appointment, Haiti was in political turmoil: former president, Jean-Bertrande Aristide, was locked in a battle to retake power in the election of 2000. Upon arrival in Haiti, Carney laid out U.S. concerns—lack of governance, lack of economic sustainability programs and an inability to prevent narco-trafficking through Haiti as the first port of call by the Cali drug cartels from Colombia.

American policy in the region was ineffective at the time. Carney's first task was to streamline reporting to Washington about ground realities in Haiti, as well as bringing in U.S. policymakers in to see firsthand what U.S. taxpayer dollars were funding in the country. Carney touted humanitarian successes of U.S. policy in Haiti, including success in preventing the spread of AIDS and providing lunch money to upwards of 500,000 Haitian students each school day. Microcredit financing efforts were also on display, as was the U.S. Coast Guard to monitor Haiti's coastline for Cali go-fast boats laden with cocaine shipments bound for the U.S. mainland.

Structural problems remained, however, including widespread political and judicial corruption, as well as police malfeasance. Haiti nevertheless slowly developed a more active civil society. As Aristide made his comeback, Carney made plans to retire to the private sector, and on December 11, 1999, resigned his post. Shortly after his term as ambassador to Haiti had ended, U.S. Senator Mike DeWine commended Carney and his wife Vicki for their efforts to improve living conditions in Haiti on July 26, 2000, in a speech from the Senate floor, "...Tim and his wife Vicki proudly represented the United States. Day in and day out, they were committed to helping the people of Haiti overcome their dismal surroundings and their dire circumstances. Tim and Vicki worked to alleviate hunger and poverty throughout the island and encouraged practical economic reforms."

=== Other assignments ===
In March 2003, Carney joined the staff of Lt. Gen. Jay Garner in Iraq and served for several months as a senior staff member in the Ministry of Industry and Minerals as part of the Coalition Provisional Authority (CPA) that governed Iraq in the aftermath of U.S. forces overthrowing the regime of Saddam Hussein. Upon arrival in Baghdad, he became critical of the plan set out by CPA, making clear that Iraq czar Paul Bremer's ideological vision was impeding progress that could have been made to stabilize Iraq. He left Baghdad two months after arriving in April 2003, disillusioned by an inability to execute a more pragmatic plan for Iraq's reconstruction. Carney returned to Washington where he made known his disagreement with the Bremer plan. In 2007, under a significant reorganization of the Iraq reconstruction effort by the Bush administration that witnessed other policy dissenters return to Baghdad, Carney was asked by the State Department to return to the U.S. Embassy in Baghdad to oversee the overall U.S. effort to rebuild Iraq.

He also lectured on areas of his expertise on Iraq from 2004 to assist in readying U.S. Army and National Guard contingents for their assignments in Iraq. In 2007, Carney returned to Iraq from February until June to serve as Coordinator for Economic Transition and was again with the State Department as Head of the Interagency Election Support Team in Kabul from March until November 2009. Throughout his long foreign service career, Carney advocated a policy of "constructive engagement" with rogue countries, often against policy prescriptions formulated by White House advisers in the administrations for whom he worked. Viewed as something of a maverick diplomat, he was often at odds with senior national security officials as well as political appointees on both sides of the aisle in Washington.

== Haiti Democracy Project ==
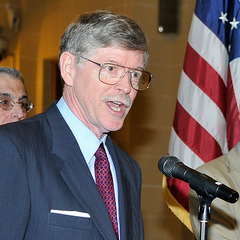
Carney in July 2011

The Haiti Democracy Project was officially launched at the Brookings Institution in November 2002 as a non-profit organization. Its funding was raised from Haitian-Americans and Haitians living in the United States, as well as other U.S. citizens. Its primary purpose was creating a more pragmatic and operative U.S. policy towards Haiti.

As Haiti's economic situation had deteriorated during the second Aristide presidency, demonstrations proliferated everywhere throughout the nation and political dialogue broke down between opposition leaders and the Aristide government. Carney, who spoke at the inaugural event and later went on to become Chairman of the Board for the project, raised concerns about whether the United States government was paying attention to the gravity of problems that were beginning to affect Haiti's stability systemically.

He criticized U.S. congressional leaders, particularly those in the Congressional Black Caucus, for a "do-nothing" attitude towards Haiti, much of which he had seen firsthand during his tenure as ambassador.

The project was criticized as an elitist forum for wealthy right-wing Haitians to promote their own agendas for Haiti's future. Funding was provided, in material part, by controversial Haitian businessman Rodolphe Boulos who was involved in a pharmaceutical poisoning controversy in 1996. The project was seen as a platform for giving opponents of the Aristide administration a hearing in Washington.

The Haiti Democracy Project's report, published on May 4, 2005, was attacked for drawing only on government bodies and officials who had a vested interest in the report's findings. Haiti's police officials were found to be the only source of information, for example, in reporting on police actions during the Aristide administration's time in office. Human rights findings were criticized for having "extreme bias" in the report.

== Clinton Bush Haiti Fund ==
In the aftermath of the earthquake in Haiti on January 10, 2010, President Barack Obama asked former presidents Bill Clinton and George W. Bush to work together in raising funds for the rehabilitation and long-term recovery of Haiti. The Clinton Bush Haiti Fund was created as a 501(c)(3) organization and began operations in 2010.

Carney served as executive vice president of the Fund until it ceased operations at the end of 2012. Its purpose was to assist Haitians in developing sustainable paradigms for medium-term and long-term economic growth as well as creating jobs that stabilize its domestic economy. The Fund raised $54 million, and during its term, the Fund estimated that its programs sustained or created 7,350 jobs, trained 20,050 individuals, and had an additional positive impact on the conditions of more than 311,000 Haitians.

Diplomatic posts
Preceded by William L. Swing	United States Ambassador to Haiti; 1998–1999	Succeeded by Brian D. Curran
Preceded by Donald K. Petterson	United States Ambassador to Sudan; 1995–1997	Succeeded by Robert E. Whitehead

== Bibliography ==
- Petterson, Donald K. (1999). Inside Sudan: Political Islam, Conflict, and Catastrophe. Westview Press, Boulder, Colorado. ISBN 9780813341118.
- Kennedy, Charles Stuart (June 24, 2002). "Ambassador Timothy Michael Carney" (PDF). The Association for Diplomatic Studies and Training Foreign Affairs Oral History Project. Association for Diplomatic Studies and Training.
