= Norman Anderson =

Norman Anderson may refer to:

- Norman C. Anderson (1928–2020), speaker of the Wisconsin State Assembly
- Norman B. Anderson (1955–2024), CEO of the American Psychological Association
- Norman H. Anderson (psychologist) (1925–2022), social psychologist at the University of California, San Diego
- Norman H. Anderson (politician) (1924–1997), American attorney and politician, attorney general of Missouri
- Norman Dalrymple Anderson (1908–1994), English missionary
- Norman Anderson (athlete) (1902–1978), American track and field athlete
- Norman Anderson, birth name of Normski, British musician
- G. Norman Anderson (born 1932), American ambassador to Sudan
