= Embassy of the United States, Bangui =

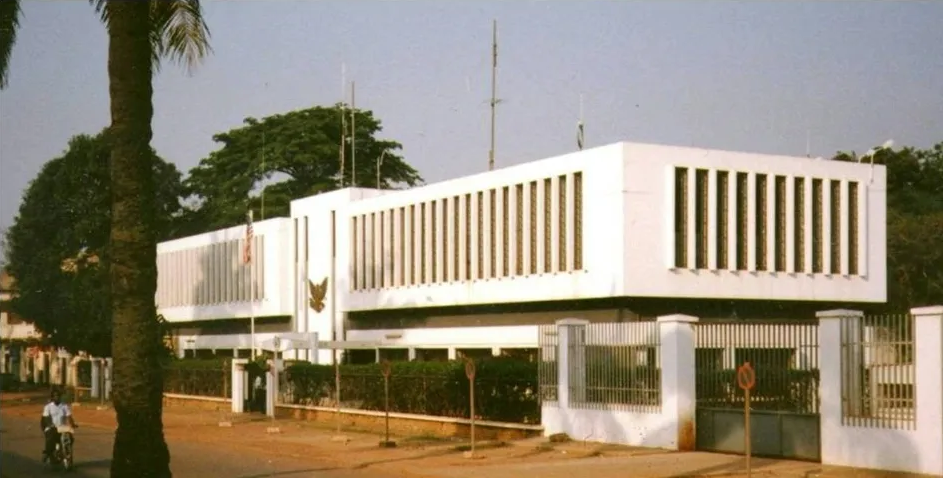
- Location: Bangui, Central African Republic
- Opened: February 10, 1961
- Closed: Temporarily closed in 1996-97, November 2002, and December 27, 2012
- Jurisdiction: Central African Republic

The Embassy of the United States, Bangui is the diplomatic mission of the United States of America in the Central African Republic. The embassy, headed by the ambassador, is located in the capital of the Central African Republic, Bangui.

== History ==
Diplomatic relations between the United States and the Central African Republic were established on August 13, 1960, following the proclamation of independence from France. On the same day, American consul in Brazzaville Alan Wood Lukens presented his credentials to David Dacko as chargé d'affaires. The U.S. Embassy in Bangui was opened on February 10, 1961, with Alan Lukens serving as the acting chargé d'affaires of the U.S. During this period, Wilton Blanke was appointed as the U.S. Ambassador to the Central African Republic.

The Central African Republic is one of the least developed countries in the world and has experienced political instability since gaining independence. As a result, the U.S. Embassy in Bangui was temporarily closed during the surge of violence in 1996-97. It reopened in 1998 with limited staff, although the missions of the United States Agency for International Development and Peace Corps did not resume their work. The American Embassy in the Central African Republic again temporarily suspended its activities in November 2002 due to security concerns arising from the military coup by François Bozizé. The embassy reopened in January 2005, but with limited consular services.

On December 27, 2012, the U.S. suspended the operations of its embassy in the Central African Republic and withdrew its diplomats due to increasing violence from rebels during the Central African Republic Civil War. Shortly after, on September 14, 2014, the American embassy in Bangui resumed normal operations.
