= List of ambassadors of the United States to the Central African Republic =

Ambassador of the United States to the Central African Republic
- Seal of the United States Department of State

- Flag of a United States ambassador

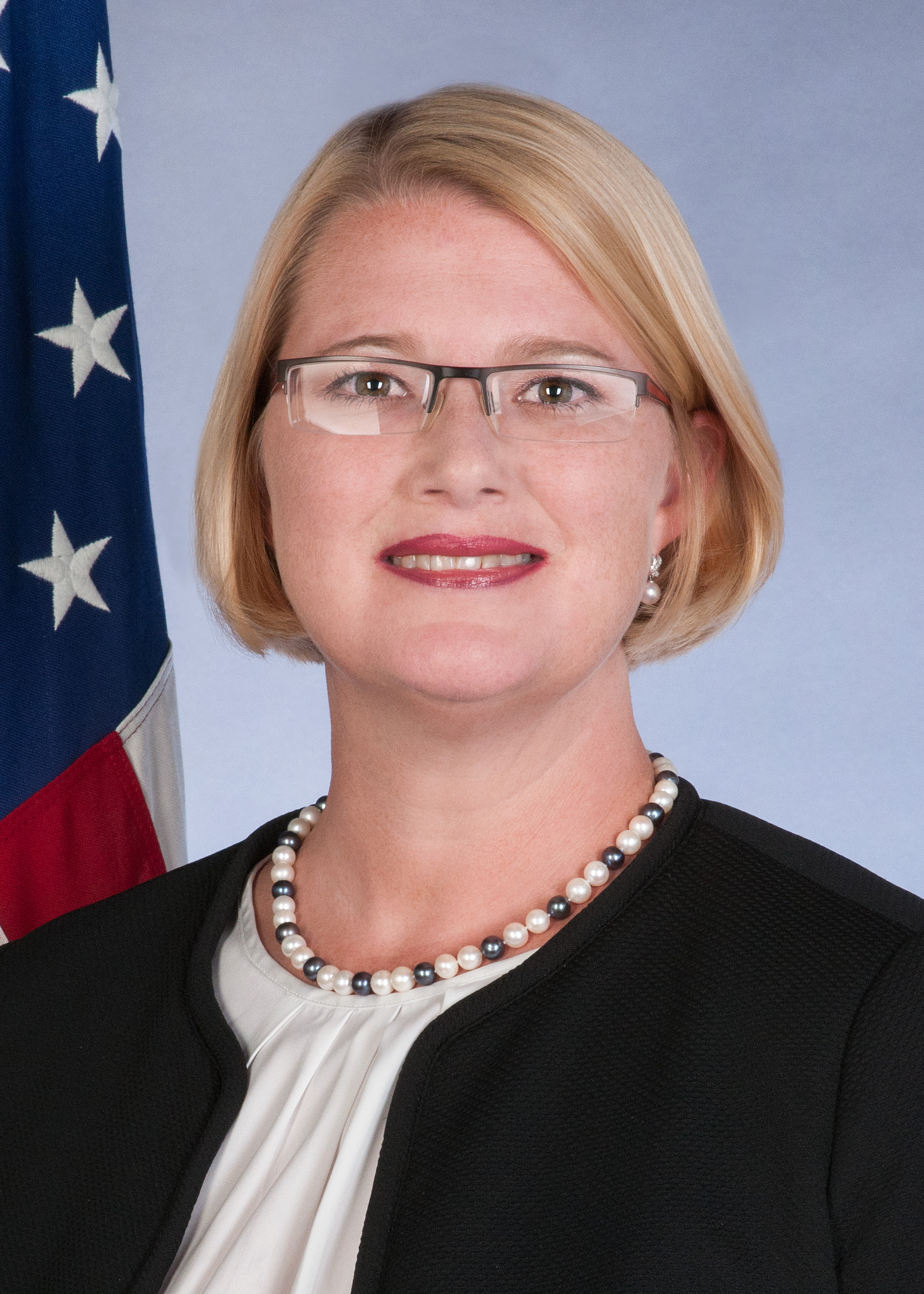
- Incumbent; Melanie Anne Zimmerman; Chargé d'affaires since August 25, 2025
- Nominator: The president of the United States
- Appointer: The president with Senate advice and consent
- Inaugural holder: Alan W. Lukens as Chargé d'affaires ad interim
- Formation: August 13, 1960
- Website: U.S. Embassy - Bangui

The United States ambassador to the Central African Republic is the ambassador of the United States to the Central African Republic.

Alan W. Lukens (resident at Brazzaville) presented credentials as chargé d'affaires ad interim on August 13, 1960. During Blancke's tenure as non-resident ambassador to the Central African Republic, the United States Embassy in Bangui was established on February 10, 1961, with Lukens as resident chargé d'affaires ad interim. Ambassador Cooke was commissioned to the Central African Empire.

== Ambassadors extraordinary and plenipotentiary ==
Name	State	Type	Appointed	Presented credentials	Mission terminated	Notes
W. Wendell Blancke	California	FSO	December 12, 1960	January 6, 1961	November 29, 1961	Commissioned during a recess of the Senate. Recommissioned after confirmation on February 6, 1961. Also accredited to Chad, Congo-Brazzaville, and Gabon; resident at Brazzaville.
John H. Burns	Oklahoma	FSO	November 10, 1961	November 29, 1961	Left post, May 6, 1963	Commissioned during a recess of the Senate; Recommissioned after confirmation on Jan 30, 1962.
Claude G. Ross	California	FSO	August 1, 1963	September 16, 1963	Left post, April 22, 1967	
Geoffrey W. Lewis	Virginia	FSO	September 13, 1967	October 23, 1967	Left post, August 2, 1970	
Melvin L. Manfull	Utah	FSO	November 23, 1970	February 4, 1971	Left post, December 13, 1972	
William N. Dale	New Mexico	FSO	July 24, 1973	September 18, 1973	Left post, July 17, 1975	
Anthony C. E. Quainton	Washington	FSO	February 4, 1976	February 20, 1976	Left post, June 9, 1978	
Goodwin Cooke	Connecticut	FSO	October 11, 1978	November 4, 1978	Left post, July 13, 1980	
Arthur H. Woodruff	Florida	FSO	May 7, 1981	July 10, 1981	Left post, August 2, 1983	
Edmund DeJarnette	Virginia	FSO	October 7, 1983	November 17, 1983	Left post, May 26, 1986	
David C. Fields	California	FSO	October 16, 1986	December 4, 1986	Left post, October 3, 1989	
Daniel Howard Simpson	Ohio	FSO	November 21, 1989	February 6, 1990	Left post, December 15, 1992	
Robert E. Gribbin III	Alabama	FSO	June 15, 1992	January 16, 1993	Left post, September 16, 1995	
Mosina H. Jordan	New York	FSO	June 27, 1995	November 29, 1995	Left post March 31, 1997	
Robert Cephas Perry	Virginia	FSO	October 12, 1998	February 1, 1999	Left post July 1, 2001	
Mattie R. Sharpless	North Carolina	FSO	October 1, 2001	December 14, 2001	Left post November 2, 2002	
Frederick B. Cook	Florida	FSO	July 27, 2007	August 29, 2007	Left post August 17, 2010	
Laurence D. Wohlers	Washington	FSO	September 8, 2010	October 30, 2010	Left post August 1, 2013	
Jeffrey J. Hawkins	California	FSO	October 15, 2015	October 30, 2015	Left post January 11, 2018	
Lucy Tamlyn	New York	FSO	January 11, 2019	February 6, 2019	Left post January 28, 2022	
Patricia Mahoney	Virginia	FSO	December 18, 2021	April 8, 2022	March 27, 2025	
Christopher Gunning	Texas	FSO	March 27, 2025		August 25, 2025	Chargé d'Affaires ad interim
Melanie Anne Zimmerman	Maryland	FSO	August 25, 2025		Present	Chargé d'Affaires ad interim

== Notes ==
- Albert E. Fairchild served as chargé d'affaires ad interim from December 1979 to July 1981.
- Embassy reopened Jan 2005. A. James Panos served as chargé d'affaires ad interim, January 2005-July 2007.

== See also ==
- Central African Republic – United States relations
- Foreign relations of the Central African Republic
