= James Cheek =

James Cheek can refer to:

- James E. Cheek (1932–2010), American educator
- James Richard Cheek (1936–2011), United States diplomat
