= 1964 in Zanzibar =

- Decades: 1940s; 1950s; 1960s
- See also: Other events of 1964; Timeline of Tanzanian history

The following lists events that happened during 1964 in Zanzibar.

== Events ==
=== January ===
- January 6 - Umma Party is banned by the Zanzibar government.
- January 12 - African nationalist rebels overthrow the predominantly Arab government of Zanzibar.

=== April ===
- April 26 - Tanganyika and Zanzibar merge to form Tanzania.
