= John Godfrey (diplomat) =

American diplomat

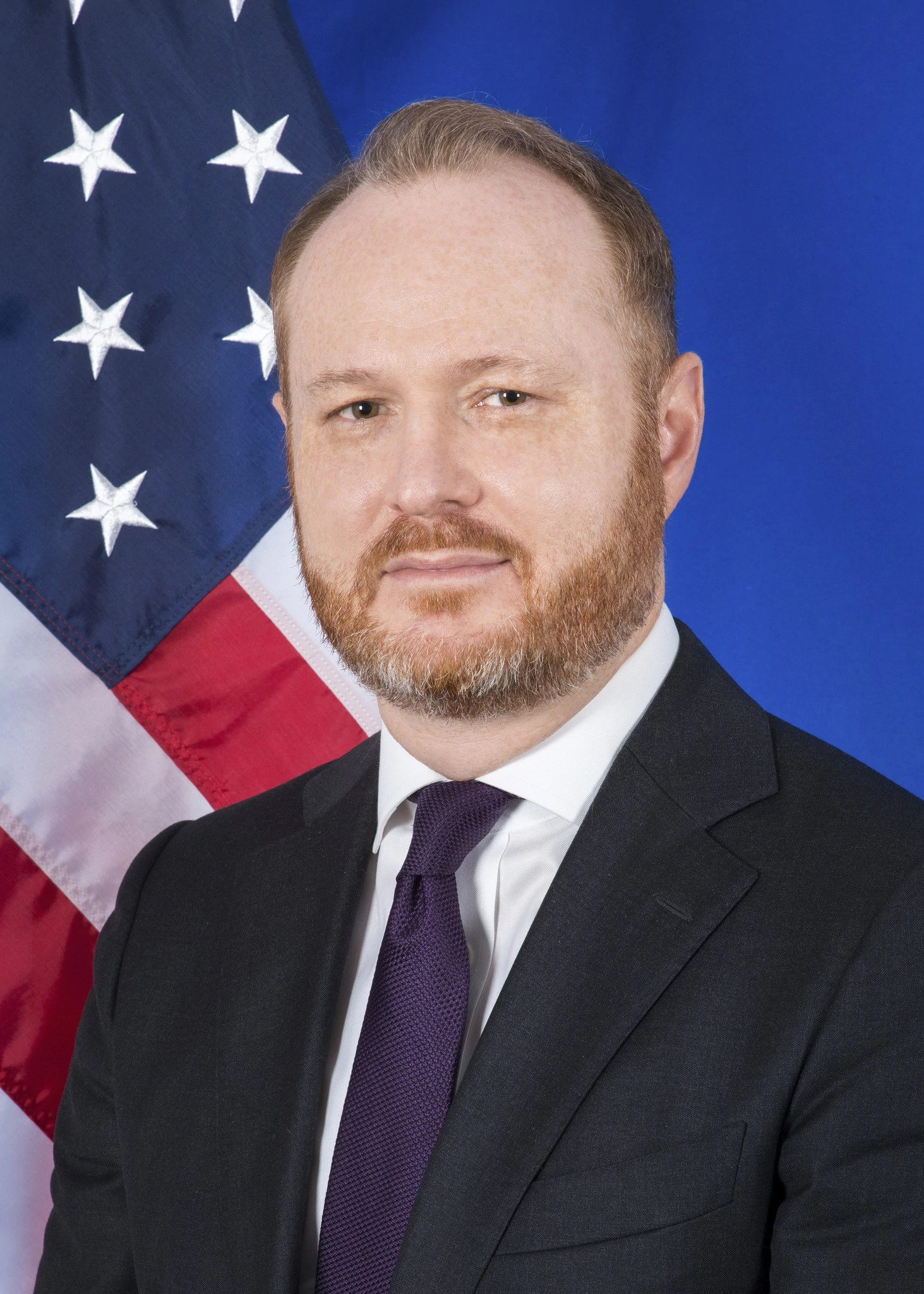

United States Ambassador to Sudan
- In office September 1, 2022 – February 23, 2024
- President: Joe Biden
- Preceded by: Lucy Tamlyn (Chargé d'Affaires)
- Succeeded by: Daniel Rubinstein (Chargé d'Affaires)

Coordinator for Counterterrorism
- Acting
- In office January 20, 2021 – March 21, 2022
- President: Joe Biden
- Preceded by: Nathan A. Sales
- Succeeded by: Timothy Alan Betts (Acting)

Personal details
- Education: University of California, Los Angeles (BA); University of Michigan (MA)

John T. Godfrey is an American diplomat and foreign policy advisor who served as the U.S. ambassador to Sudan from 2022 to 2024, the first confirmed ambassador to the country since 1995.

== Education ==
Godfrey earned a Bachelor of Arts in political science from the University of California, Los Angeles and a Master of Arts in Middle East and North Africa studies from the University of Michigan.

== Career ==
Godfrey began his career as an assistant to the assistant secretary of state for near eastern affairs. He later served as political and economic chief in Ashgabat and as a political officer in Damascus. From 2007 to 2009, he served as a political and economic counselor at the U.S. embassy in Tripoli. In 2009 and 2010, he served as deputy political counselor for northern affairs at the Embassy of the United States, Baghdad. After serving as an arms control counselor at the United Nations Office at Vienna, he was chief of staff for Deputy Secretary of State William J. Burns. He later served in the U.S. embassy in Riyadh. Since January 2021, Godfrey has served as acting coordinator for counterterrorism.

=== Ambassador to Sudan ===
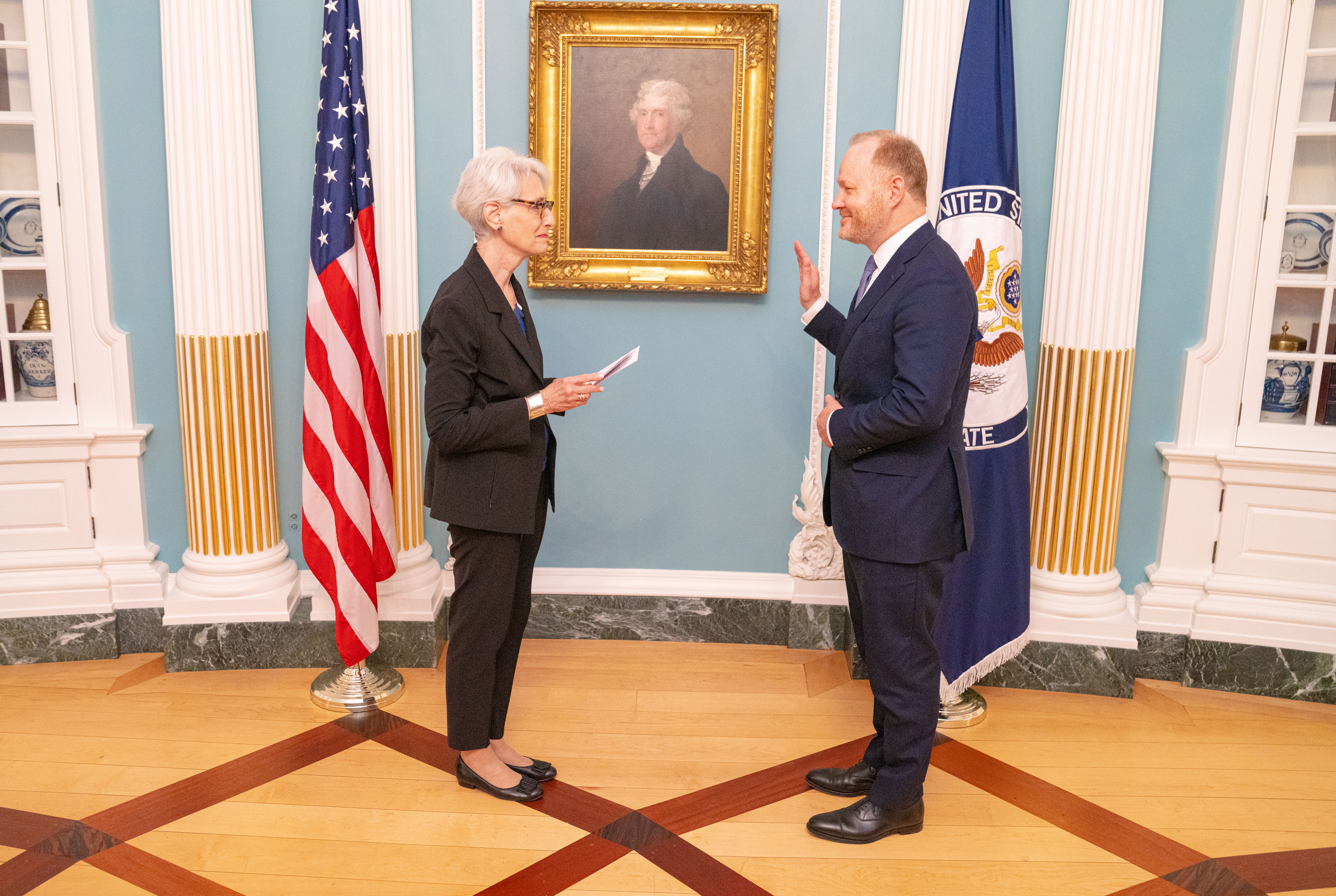
Godfrey sworn in as ambassador to Sudan by Deputy Secretary of State Wendy Sherman in 2022

On January 26, 2022, President Joe Biden nominated Godfrey to be the ambassador to Sudan. Hearings on his nomination were held before the Senate Foreign Relations Committee on May 24, 2022. The committee favorably reported his nomination on June 9, 2022. On July 14, 2022, his nomination was confirmed by voice vote. He was sworn into office on August 23, 2022, and he presented his credentials to Sudanese head of state Abdel Fattah al-Burhan on September 1, 2022.

Godfrey is the first diplomat to serve in a permanent role there since Timothy M. Carney in 1996.

Godfrey resigned from his ambassadorial position in February 2024.

== Personal life ==
Godfrey speaks Arabic.

Diplomatic posts
Preceded by Lucy Tamlyn; Chargé d'Affaires	United States Ambassador to Sudan; 2022–2024	Succeeded by Daniel Rubinstein; Chargé d'Affaires
