= Cleo A. Noel Jr. =

American diplomat

United States Ambassador to Sudan
- In office December 23, 1972 – March 2, 1973
- President: Richard Nixon
- Preceded by: William H. Weathersby
- Succeeded by: William D. Brewer

Personal details
- Born: Cleo Allen Noel Jr. August 6, 1918 Oklahoma City, Oklahoma, U.S.
- Died: March 2, 1973 (aged 54) Khartoum, Sudan
- Education: Moberly Junior College; University of Missouri
- Occupation: Educator, diplomat

Cleo Allen Noel Jr. (August 6, 1918 – March 2, 1973) was a United States ambassador to Sudan who was murdered by the Palestinian terrorist organization Black September in the 1973 attack on the Saudi embassy in Khartoum.

== Early life ==
Born in Oklahoma City, Oklahoma, Noel spent his formative years in Moberly, Missouri. He attended Moberly Junior College and then University of Missouri, receiving a B.A. in History in 1939 and a M.A. in the same subject in 1940.

== Career ==
Noel worked briefly as an educator, teaching American history at the University of Missouri before joining the United States Navy in June 1941. During World War II he served as a gunnery officer providing security aboard merchant vessels throughout the Pacific Ocean and Persian Gulf; in fall 1945 Noel discharged from the navy at the rank of lieutenant commander.

=== U.S. Foreign Service career ===
After the war, while studying for his PhD at Harvard, Noel passed the United States Foreign Service exam and was hired by the Department of State. In 1951 he married fellow Foreign Service worker Lucille McHenry. Throughout the 1950s and 1960s Noel served with U.S. consulates in Italy, Saudi Arabia, France, Lebanon and Sudan. Noel was particularly fascinated with the Middle East and regularly toured the region, learning the Arabic language.

=== Ambassadorship to Sudan and death ===
On December 23, 1972, Noel was appointed U.S. Ambassador to Sudan when Sudan and the U.S. reestablished diplomatic relations severed as the result of the 1967 Arab-Israeli War. The outgoing Charge d'Affairs, George Curtis Moore, was asked to stay on as Deputy Chief of Mission until the new Deputy arrived in March.

On the evening of March 1, 1973, militants from the Black September faction of PLO stormed the Saudi Embassy in Khartoum, where a farewell ceremony for Moore had just concluded. Noel was wounded during the taking, he and Moore were among the ten diplomats taken hostage by the militants. The next day, March 2, the hostage takers shot Noel to death. Also executed were his deputy, Moore; and Belgian diplomat Guy Eid.

After a joint funeral on March 7 at the National Presbyterian Church in Washington D.C., Noel and Moore were buried with military honors at Arlington National Cemetery.

== See also ==
- Ambassadors of the United States killed in office

Diplomatic posts
Preceded by William H. Weathersby	United States Ambassador to Sudan; 1972–1973	Succeeded by William D. Brewer
