= Laurence D. Wohlers =

American diplomat

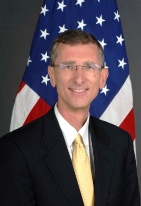
Image of Laurence D Wohlers

Laurence D. Wohlers (born 1955) is Deputy Special Representative (Political) for the United Nations Multidimensional Integrated Stabilization Mission in the Central African Republic (MINUSCA), appointed by United Nations Secretary-General Ban Ki-moon on 25 April 2014.

From the United States, Wohlers has served in the Foreign Service for many years, most recently as his country's Ambassador to the Central African Republic from 2010 to 2013.

Wohlers holds a master's degree in national security studies from the National Defense University, and a bachelor's degree from the Washington University in St. Louis. He has previously held other diplomatic posts in Africa, as well as in Asia, Europe and Washington, D.C., including recent posts as Minister Counsellor for Political Affairs to the European Union in Brussels, from 2006 to 2008, and Minister Counsellor for Public Affairs in Moscow, from 2003 to 2006.

Diplomatic posts
Preceded by Frederick B. Cook	United States Ambassador to Central African Republic; 2010–2013	Succeeded by Jeffrey Hawkins
