= Jeffrey J. Hawkins =

American diplomat (born 1966)

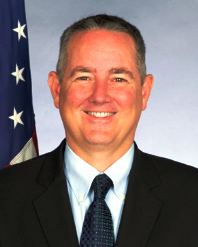

United States Ambassador to the Central African Republic
- In office October 16, 2015 – August 25, 2017
- President: Barack Obama; Donald Trump
- Preceded by: Laurence D. Wohlers
- Succeeded by: Lucy Tamlyn

Personal details
- Born: 1966 (age 59–60) Lexington, Virginia, U.S.
- Spouse: Annie Chansavang
- Children: Maxime, Alexandre and Raphael Hawkins
- Education: University of California, Berkeley, university of Southern California

Jeffrey J. Hawkins (born 1966) is an academic and former American diplomat who served as United States Ambassador to the Central African Republic from 2015 to 2017. He was the director of the American Library in Paris from 2017 to 2018, and since then has taught at Sciences Po Paris(campus de Paris and Reims), Sciences Po Lille, Sciences Po Saint-Germain-en-Laye and Leiden University.

== Consular career ==
Hawkins joined the State Department in 1994 and was first posted to Abidjan, Ivory Coast as a political officer. He was moved to be deputy consular section chief in Chennai, India in 1996, and to Islamabad, Pakistan as a political officer in 1999.

In 2002, Hawkins was recalled to work as desk officer for Kazakhstan and Turkmenistan in Washington and as acting deputy director for the Office of Central Asian Affairs. After the 9/11 terrorist attacks, he joined the Naval Reserve and was temporarily released from his Foreign Service duties in 2003 to join a tour in Afghanistan, where he was also a political and economic counselor in the Kabul embassy. In this post, Hawkins helped write the new Afghan constitution.

From 2004 to 2006, Hawkins was posted to Brunei as deputy chief of mission in Bandar Seri Begawan, then he was sent to the embassy in Lille, France, as the consul. Hawkins was again made deputy chief of mission in 2008, but this time in Luanda, Angola. He was recalled in 2010 to be director of the Office of Near East and South and Central Asia in the Bureau of Democracy, Human Rights and Labor where he organised human rights programmes in the countries under his jurisdiction. He also left the Naval Reserve at this time.

In 2012, Hawkins was sent to be consul general in Lagos, Nigeria where he remained until his nomination for the ambassadorship to the Central African Republic by President Obama on April 16, 2015. He was confirmed for the post on October 8, 2015.

Hawkins retired from the Foreign Service in 2017, leaving his post as ambassador in September and being succeeded by David P. Brownstein as charge d'affairs at the consulate.

== Post-consular career ==
After his retirement from the Foreign Service in September 2017, Hawkins took up the post of director at the American Library in Paris, succeeding Charles Trueheart. He became a professor at Sciences Po Paris in 2018, teaching a course on the impact of Donald Trump on US politics and foreign policy, and a course on US diplomacy towards Africa. By 2020, Hawkins was teaching at Sciences Po Saint-Germain-en-Laye, and by 2022 at Leiden University.

== Personal life ==
Hawkins has three children with his current wife, Annie Chansavang, named Maxime, Alexandre, and Raphael. He can speak Portuguese and French fluently.

Diplomatic posts
Preceded by Laurence D. Wohlers	United States Ambassador to the Central African Republic; 2015 – 2017	Succeeded by Lucy Tamlyn
Cultural offices
Preceded by Charles Trueheart	Director of the American Library in Paris; 2017 – 2018	Succeeded by Audrey Chapuis
