= James Richard Cheek =

American diplomat (1936–2011)

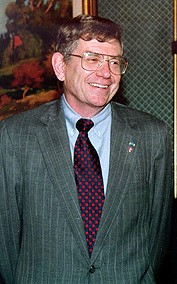

45th United States Ambassador to Argentina
- In office May 28, 1993 – December 18, 1996
- President: Bill Clinton
- Preceded by: Terence A. Todman
- Succeeded by: James Donald Walsh

United States Ambassador to Sudan
- In office October 10, 1989 – August 8, 1992
- President: George H. W. Bush
- Preceded by: G. Norman Anderson
- Succeeded by: Donald K. Petterson

Personal details
- Born: April 27, 1936 Decatur, Georgia
- Died: May 16, 2011 (aged 75) Little Rock, Arkansas
- Profession: Diplomat
- Awards: Distinguished Honor Award

James Richard Cheek (April 27, 1936 – May 16, 2011) was an American diplomat.

== Life ==
Born in Decatur, Georgia, Cheek served as United States Ambassador to Sudan in 1989, succeeding G. Norman Anderson and later was the United States Ambassador to Argentina from 1993–1996. He lived in Little Rock, Arkansas.

== Foreign service career ==
Cheek served as a career member of the Foreign Service beginning in 1962. Over the years he served in many notable positions with the State Department including chief of the political section from 1971–1974, congressional fellow for the United States Senate and House of Representatives, 1974 – 1975; Deputy Director for Regional Affairs in the Bureau of Near East and South Asian Affairs, 1975 – 1977; and deputy chief of mission in Montevideo, 1977 – 1979. He has served as Deputy Assistant Secretary of State for Inter-American Affairs, 1979 – 1981.

Cheek was a foreign affairs fellow at Howard University and Fletcher School of Law and Diplomacy, 1981 – 1982; deputy chief of mission in Kathmandu, 1982 – 1985; and chief of mission and Chargé d'Affaires in Addis Ababa, 1985 – 1988.

From 1988 he was diplomat-in-residence at Howard University.

== Notes ==
Diplomatic posts
| Preceded by G. Norman Anderson | United States Ambassador to Sudan; 1989–1992 | Succeeded by Donald K. Petterson |
| Preceded by Terence A. Todman | United States Ambassador to Argentina; 1993–1996 | Succeeded by Ronald D. Godard |
