= Lucy Tamlyn =

American diplomat (born 1955)

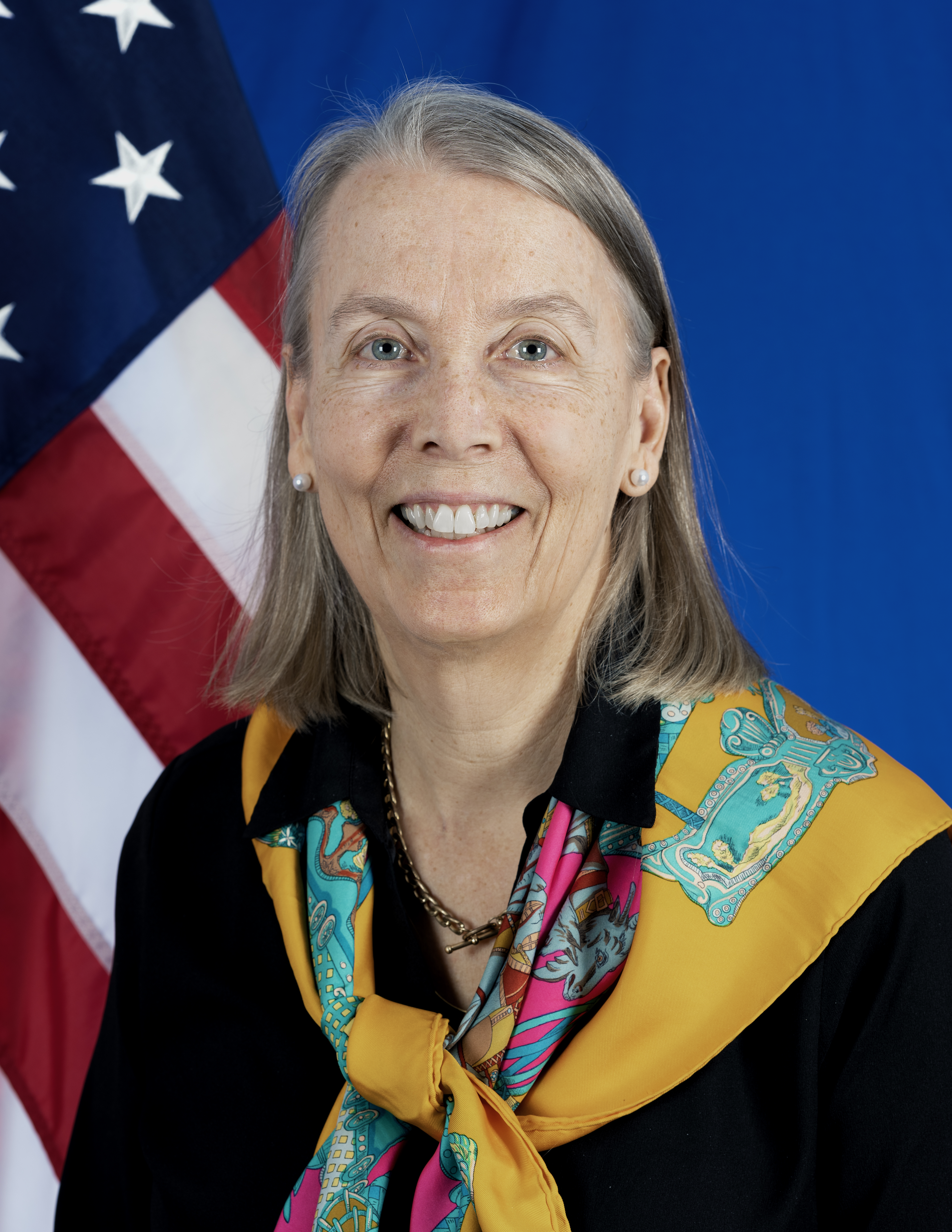
- Official portrait, 2022

United States Ambassador to the Democratic Republic of the Congo
- In office February 6, 2023 – December 31, 2025
- President: Joe Biden; Donald Trump
- Preceded by: Michael A. Hammer

United States Ambassador to Sudan
- Acting
- In office February 3, 2022 – August 24, 2022
- President: Joe Biden
- Preceded by: Brian W. Shukan (acting)
- Succeeded by: John Godfrey

United States Ambassador to the Central African Republic
- In office February 6, 2019 – January 28, 2022
- President: Donald Trump; Joe Biden
- Preceded by: Jeffrey Hawkins
- Succeeded by: Patricia Mahoney

United States Ambassador to Benin
- In office November 8, 2015 – October 19, 2018
- President: Barack Obama; Donald Trump
- Preceded by: Michael A. Raynor
- Succeeded by: Patricia Mahoney

Personal details
- Born: 1955 (age 70–71)
- Education: St. John’s College (BA); Columbia University (MA)

Lucy Tamlyn (born 1955) is an American diplomat who had served as the United States ambassador to the Democratic Republic of the Congo. She previously served as chargé d'affaires to Sudan (from February to August 2022); as United States ambassador to the Central African Republic (from 2019 to 2022); and as United States ambassador to Benin (from 2015 to 2018).

== Early life and education ==
Tamlyn is from New York City. Her father, Thomas Tamlyn, was a cardiologist who served in 1969 on the SS Hope, a ship that brought medical support to underserved areas. Her mother, Ann Donaldson Tamlyn, later ran unsuccessfully for a seat in the United States House of Representatives.

Tamlyn earned a Bachelor of Arts from St. John's College in 1978. Tamlyn then completed her Master of Arts at Columbia University's School of International Affairs in 1980.

== Career ==
Tamlyn joined the United States Foreign Service in 1982. In her early career, she held assignments in Austria, Colombia, Mozambique, and domestically, in Washington, DC and New York City, NY. She served as political officer in Brazil and represented the United States to the Food and Agriculture Organization in Rome. From 2005 to 2008, Tamlyn served as deputy chief of mission at the United States Embassy in N’Djamena, Chad. She then became provincial reconstruction team leader in Erbil, Iraq from 2008 to 2009. After Iraq, she served in Paris, France, as Economic Counselor at the United States Mission to the Organization for Economic Cooperation and Development, and in Lisbon, Portugal as deputy chief of mission at the United States Embassy there. From 2013 to 2015, Tamlyn served in Washington, DC as director of the Office of the Special Envoy for Sudan and South Sudan.

=== Ambassador to Benin ===
On March 24, 2015, President Barack Obama nominated Tamlyn to be the next United States ambassador to the Republic of Benin. Hearings were held on her nomination by the Senate Foreign Relations Committee on July 30, 2015. The committee favorably reported the nomination to the Senate floor on October 1, 2015. She was confirmed by the Senate on October 8, 2015, via voice vote. Her term began October 13, 2015, and she presented her credentials on November 8, 2015. She left her post as ambassador to Benin in October 2018.

=== Ambassador to Central African Republic ===
On July 27, 2018, President Donald Trump nominated Tamlyn to be the next United States ambassador to the Central African Republic. Hearings on her nomination were held by the Senate Foreign Relations Committee on September 26, 2018. The committee favorably reported the nomination on November 28, 2018. She was confirmed by the Senate via voice vote on January 2, 2019, and sworn in on January 11, 2019. Tamlyn presented her credentials to President Faustin-Archange Touadéra on February 6, 2019. She left her post as ambassador to the Central African Republic in January 2022.

=== Charge d'Affaires to Sudan ===
Tamlyn was appointed Chargé d'Affaires ad interim to Sudan on January 17, 2022. She arrived in Khartoum on February 3, 2022, and she left on August 11, 2022.

=== Ambassador to DRC ===
On June 22, 2022, President Joe Biden nominated Tamlyn to serve as the United States ambassador to the Democratic Republic of the Congo. Hearings on her nomination were held before the Senate Foreign Relations Committee on August 3, 2022. The committee favorably reported her nomination to the Senate floor on December 7, 2022. On December 20, 2022, her nomination was confirmed by the Senate via voice vote.

Tamlyn was officially sworn in as ambassador to the Democratic Republic of the Congo on December 28, 2022. She arrived in Kinshasa on January 26, 2023, and she presented her credentials to President Félix Tshisekedi on February 6, 2023.

== Awards and recognitions ==
Tamlyn has won notable State Department awards, including the Secretary's Award for Expeditionary Service.

== Personal life ==
Tamlyn is married to travel writer and photographer Jorge M. Serpa of Portugal. They have two children. She speaks French and Portuguese.

== See also ==
- Ambassadors of the United States

Diplomatic posts
Preceded by Michael A. Raynor	United States Ambassador to Benin; 2015–2018	Succeeded by Patricia Mahoney
Preceded by Jeffrey Hawkins	United States Ambassador to the Central African Republic; 2019–2022	Succeeded by Patricia A. Mahoney
Preceded by Michael A. Hammer	United States Ambassador to the Democratic Republic of the Congo; 2023–2025	Vacant
