= Saudi Arabia–Sudan relations =

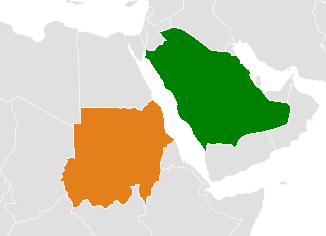

- Saudi Arabia: Sudan

Diplomatic mission
- Saudi Arabian embassy, Khartoum: Sudanese embassy, Riyadh

Despite both being majority Arab nations, the relationship between Saudi Arabia and Sudan is often marked with divisions between cooperation and conflict. Due to this, Sudan and Saudi Arabia often have some significant rifts with each other over diplomatic stances. Omar al-Bashir's recent decision to send Sudanese troops fighting in Yemen was considered to be a boost of developing relationship, which had once been strained for decades. As a result, Sudan was admitted into Saudi Arabia's fragile Islamic Military Alliance.

== History ==
Sudan and Saudi Arabia established relationship after Sudanese independence in 1956. Relationship between two countries was seen as stable, despite several instability issues in Sudan.

On March 1, 1973, the Saudi embassy in Khartoum was attacked by the Palestinian guerrillas which was an attempt to affect the Middle East policy of the US.

However, after Omar al-Bashir put a coup in 1989, relations soon strained. Sudan was accused by Saudi Arabia to be a client state of Iran and had involved, in a limit level, sanctions against Sudan as well as providing Darfur rebels and the Saudi Government also called for the separation of South Sudan, which was finally achieved in 2011. Saudi Arabia also called to charge Sudan's al-Bashir for the "genocide" in Darfur, although Saudi Arabia also pledged to fund for the reconstruction of Darfur. Relationship between Saudi Arabia and Sudan was significantly sour.

Prior to Yemeni war, in 2014, the two had been working to restore the tie, which was address by al-Bashir as "normal".

=== Gulf War ===
Sudan had stood against Saudi Arabia during the Gulf War, fueled angers among other Arab countries including Saudi Arabia, who was defending Kuwait against Iraq. As for the result, Saudi Arabia imposed harsher economic sanctions and reduced diplomatic ties with Sudan.

=== 2014 Yemeni Civil War ===
The war in Yemen provided a significant change in the relations, which turned Saudi Arabia and Sudan from rivalry into partnership. Sudan had expelled Iranian diplomats from the country and sent troops to fight alongside Saudi troops in Yemen against the Houthis. This surprising change put Sudan on the headline and the Saudi Government had reapproached Sudan. This made two nations boosted their tie again while the relationship between Sudan and Iran had gone into a very low point.

Two countries have been engaging in a closer military cooperation and Sudan had lobbied Saudi Arabia to lift off sanctions against Sudan by the United States, a long time ally of Saudi Arabia, which, was done in 2017 under Trump Administration. However, given the historical mistreatment in the two nations' relations, it is unclear how long the alliance could last.

In May 2021, Saudi Arabia decided to grant Sudan $20 million to help the country with its debt with the International Monetary Fund (IMF).

== See also ==
- Foreign relations of Saudi Arabia
- Foreign relations of Sudan
- Attack on the Saudi Embassy in Khartoum
