= Patricia A. Mahoney =

American diplomat (born 1959)

Patricia Mahoney
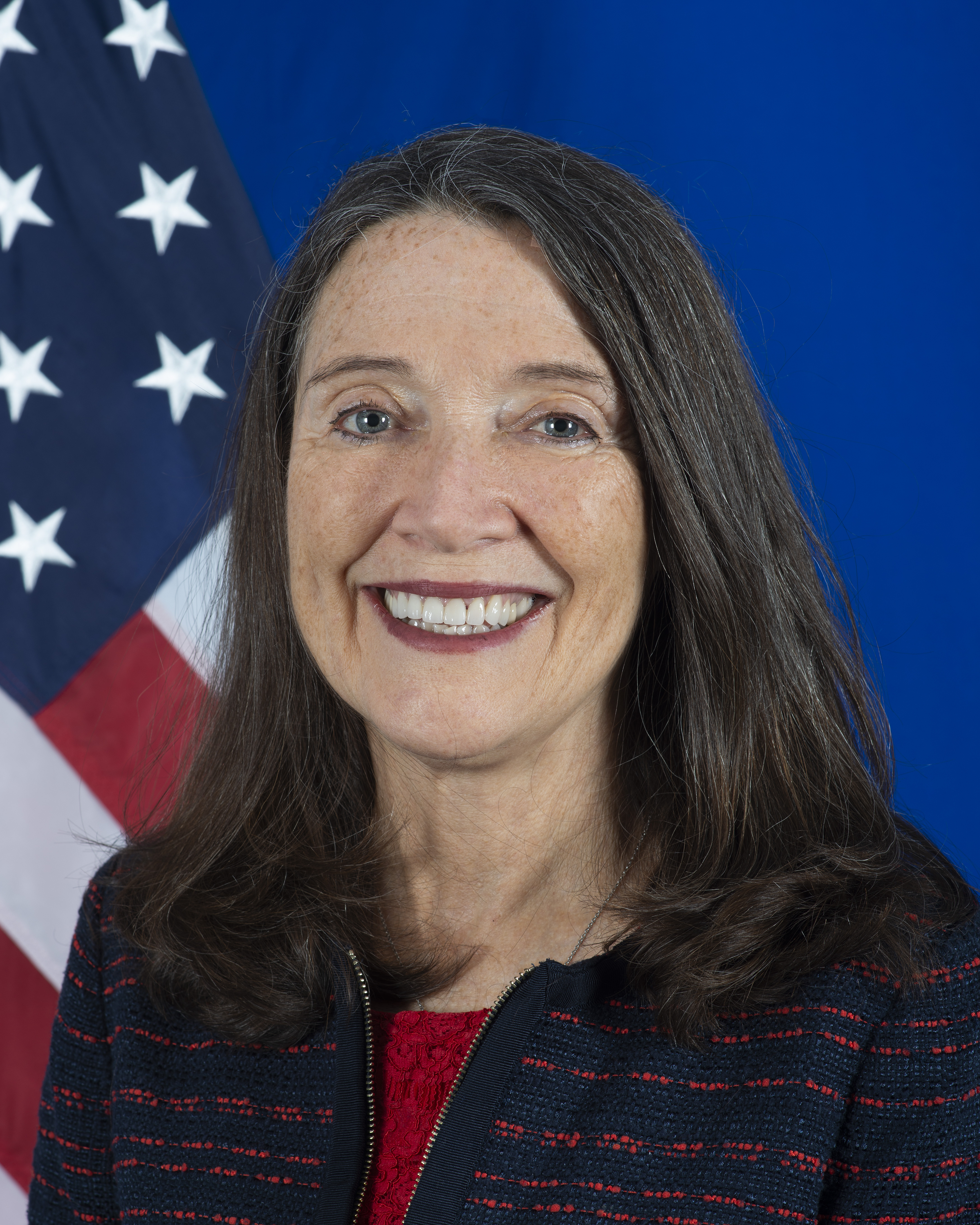

United States Ambassador to the Central African Republic
- In office April 8, 2022 – March 27, 2025
- President: Joe Biden; Donald Trump
- Preceded by: Lucy Tamlyn

United States Ambassador to Benin
- In office July 4, 2019 – February 1, 2022
- President: Donald Trump; Joe Biden
- Preceded by: Lucy Tamlyn
- Succeeded by: Brian W. Shukan

Personal details
- Born: February 10, 1959 Stamford, Connecticut, U.S.
- Education: Harvard College (BA); University of Hawaii (MA); National War College (MS)

Patricia Alice Mahoney is an American diplomat who had served as the United States Ambassador to the Central African Republic. She previously served as the United States Ambassador to Benin.

== Early life and education ==
Mahoney graduated from Stanford High School in Stamford, Connecticut in 1977. Mahoney earned her Bachelor of Arts degree, cum laude, from Harvard College in 1981. In 1988, she earned a Master of Arts from the University of Hawaiʻi. Mahoney attended the National War College from 2008 to 2009, becoming a Distinguished Graduate as she received her Master of Science in 2009.

== Career ==
Mahoney's career in the United States Foreign Service has included both domestic and international assignments. From 2001 to 2004, she served as political and economic chief at the U.S. Embassy in Kathmandu, Nepal, before becoming political chief at the U.S. Embassy in Colombo, Sri Lanka, where she remained until 2006. Mahoney then served as director for South Asia for the United States National Security Council from 2006 to 2008.

Following her graduation from the National War College, she became deputy director in the Office of India, Nepal, Sri Lanka and Bangladesh Affairs in the Bureau of South and Central Asian Affairs until 2010, when she became deputy chief of mission at the American Embassy in Kathmandu, Nepal, where she served for three years. From 2013 to 2016, Mahoney was deputy chief of mission of the American Embassy in Kampala, Uganda. She then became the director of the Office of Mainland Southeast Asia from 2016 to 2018.

=== Ambassador to Benin ===
In 2018, President Donald Trump nominated Mahoney to become United States Ambassador to Benin. The Senate approved her nomination on January 2, 2019. She was sworn into office January 18, 2019. Mahoney presented her credentials in Benin on July 4, 2019.

=== Ambassador to Central African Republic ===
On July 27, 2021, President Joe Biden nominated Mahoney to be the United States Ambassador to the Central African Republic. Her nomination was sent to the Senate the following day. Hearings on her nomination were held before the Senate Foreign Relations Committee on October 20, 2021. The committee reported her favorably on November 3, 2021. On December 18, 2021, the United States Senate confirmed her nomination by voice vote. She presented her credentials to President Faustin-Archange Touadéra on April 8, 2022.

== Personal ==
Mahoney has three adult children. She speaks French, Thai, Nepali, and Lao.

== See also ==
- List of current ambassadors of the United States

Diplomatic posts
Preceded by Lucy Tamlyn	United States Ambassador to Benin; 2019–2022	Succeeded by Brian W. Shukan
Preceded by Lucy Tamlyn	United States Ambassador to Central African Republic; 2022–2025	Vacant
