= Brian W. Shukan =

American ambassador and diplomat

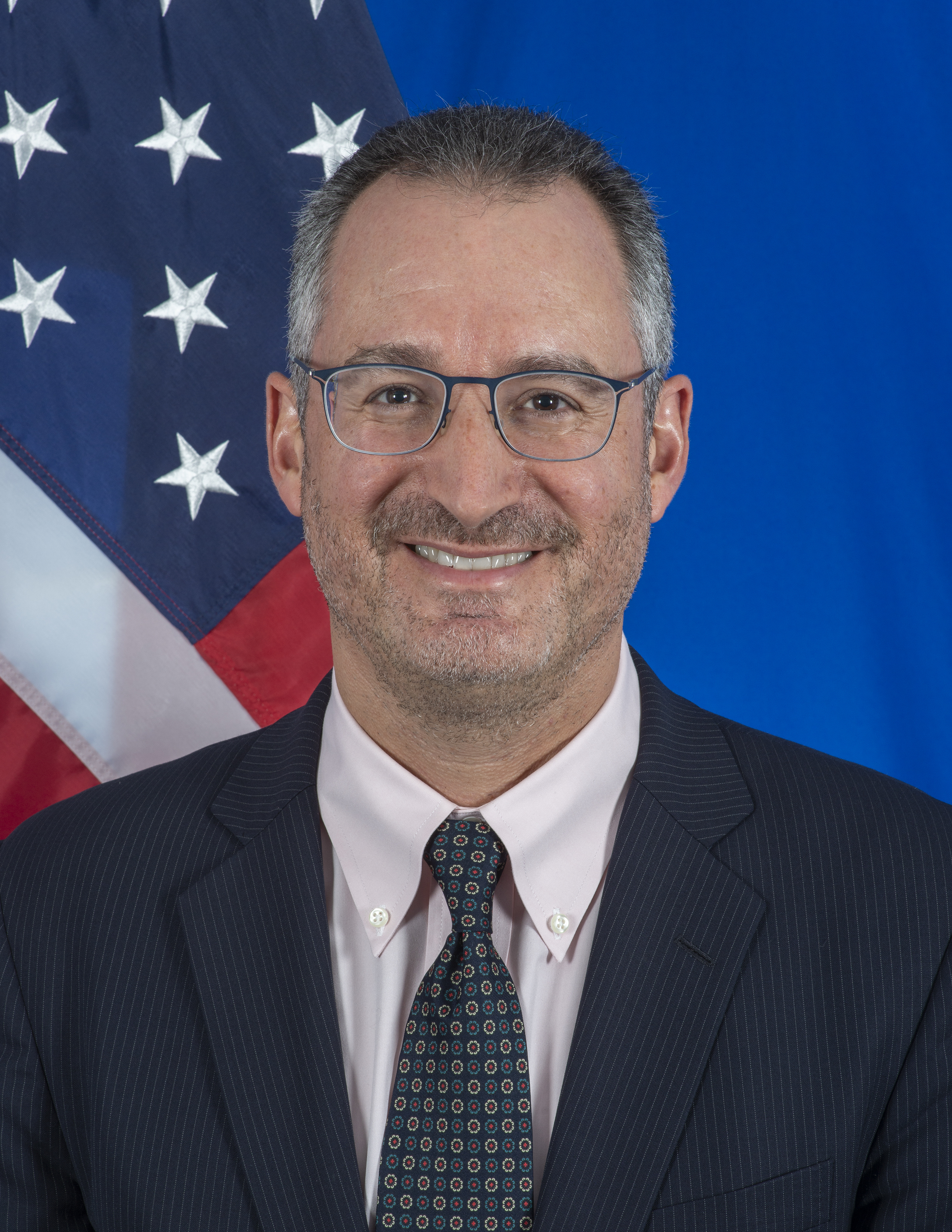
- Official portrait, 2019

United States Ambassador to Benin
- In office May 5, 2022 – February 20, 2026
- President: Joe Biden; Donald Trump
- Preceded by: Patricia Mahoney
- Succeeded by: Peter Lord

Charge d’Affaires ad interim to Sudan
- In office October 2019 – January 2022
- President: Donald Trump; Joe Biden
- Preceded by: Steven Koutsis
- Succeeded by: Lucy Tamlyn

Personal details
- Education: University of Wisconsin (BA); Naval War College (MA); Washington University in St. Louis (JD)

Brian Wesley Shukan is a career member of the Senior Foreign Service (class of Minister-Counselor) who had served as the United States ambassador to Benin. He previously served as the U.S. chief of mission in Khartoum from October 2019 to January 2022.

== Early life and education ==
Shukan was raised in Longmeadow, Massachusetts. He received a Bachelor of Arts in History and Philosophy from the University of Wisconsin-Madison, a Juris Doctor from Washington University School of Law, and a Master of Arts in national security and strategic studies from the Naval War College.

== Career ==
Shukan served as Director of the Office of the Special Envoy for Sudan and South Sudan at the U.S. Department of State and from 2014 to 2017 as Chargé d'Affaires and Deputy Chief of Mission at the U.S. Embassy in Port-au-Prince, Haiti. From 2011 to 2014, Shukan served as Principal Officer at the U.S. Consulate General in Casablanca, Morocco. He has been considered the top State Department official in Washington on Sudan.

=== Tenure in Sudan ===
The U.S. named Sudan a state sponsor of terrorism in 1993 when Omar al-Bashir was President of Sudan. Prime Minister Abdallah Hamdok “has repeatedly urged the West to end his country’s international pariah status ... (saying) it’s the only way to save the nation’s fragile democratic transition from a plunging economy.” By lifting sanctions, Sudan would be eligible for loans from the International Monetary Fund and World Bank. It has been said, “Sudan needs up to $8 billion in foreign aid in the next two years and another $2 billion deposited as reserves to shore up the local currency.”

To that end, Sudanese Assistant Undersecretary Elham Ahmed met with Shukan in October 2019 and “found herself repeating the same demand ... asking for a U.S. plan to end the designation.” On November 3, 2019, Shukan told Sudanese Foreign Minister Asma Abdalla “that there are attempts to remove Sudan from the U.S. list but that this ‘requires some time.’”. On October 31, 2019, Donald Trump renewed the state of national emergency in Sudan, keeping it on the list of State Sponsors of Terrorism (SST).

=== Ambassador to Benin ===
On August 4, 2021, President Joe Biden nominated Shukan to be the next United States Ambassador to Benin. The Senate Foreign Relations Committee held hearings on his nomination on October 20, 2021. The committee reported him favorably on November 3, 2021. On December 18, 2021, he was confirmed by the United States Senate via voice vote. He presented his credentials to President Patrice Talon on May 5, 2022. He left this role as ambassador on Februeary 20, 2026.

== Personal life ==
Shukan speaks French and Arabic.

Diplomatic posts
Preceded by Patricia Mahoney	United States Ambassador to Benin; 2022–present	Incumbent
