= Ali Muhsin al-Barwani =

Zanzibari politician (1919–2006)

Ali Muhsin Al-Barwani (13 January 1919 in Stone Town – 20 March 2006 in Muscat, Oman) was a Zanzibari politician and diplomat under the Sultanate of Zanzibar. He was the only Arab foreign minister of an independent Zanzibar, from its independence (becoming a constitutional monarchy in the British Commonwealth) on 10 December 1963 to the overthrow of the last Sultan on 12 January 1964, establishing the People's Republic of Zanzibar.

When his government was overthrown, Barwani was held in detention centers across Tanzania until his release in 1974, when he fled to Kenya as a refugee. After obtaining refugee status, Barwani moved to Cairo then back to Kenya then to Dubai in the United Arab Emirates. In 1995, Barwani translated the Qur'an into Swahili (Swahili kiUnguja), and his name appears with thanks from the publisher in the early pages of Darussalam Research Division editions.

== Education ==
Barwani graduated from Makerere University in Kampala, Uganda, in 1942. In 1948, he became the editor of the independent weekly newspaper Mwongozi.

Preceded by None	Foreign Minister of Zanzibar; 1963–1964	Succeeded by Abdulrahman Mohamed Babu
