= G. Norman Anderson =

American diplomat and author (born 1932)

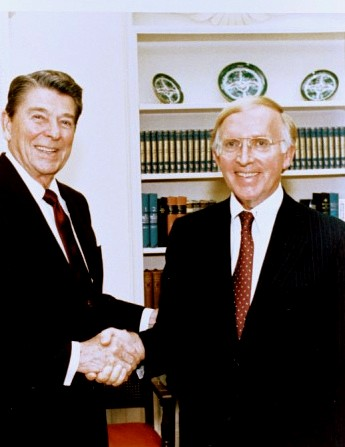

United States Ambassador to Sudan
- In office August 12, 1986 – October 24, 1989
- President: Ronald Reagan
- Preceded by: Hume Alexander Horan
- Succeeded by: James Richard Cheek

Personal details
- Born: March 26, 1932 (age 94) Lewes, Delaware, United States
- Spouse: Mary (Bonnie) Anderson
- Children: Ian Anderson; R. Whitney Anderson; Amy Anderson
- Education: Columbia College (B.A.); Columbia University School of International and Public Affairs (Master's Degree)
- Occupation: US Diplomat

G. Norman Anderson (born March 26, 1932) is an American diplomat and author, serving as the United States ambassador to Sudan from 1986 to 1989.

== Early life and education ==
Anderson was born in Lewes, Delaware. He graduated from Columbia College in 1954 with a Bachelor of Arts. He completed a master's degree at the School of International and Public Affairs, Columbia University in 1960. At Columbia, he studied Russian and Soviet affairs at the Harriman Institute.

== Career ==
Anderson served in the United States Navy as a lieutenant from 1954 to 1958. He then joined the Foreign Service as a personnel officer from 1960 to 1962. His first assignment was as political officer in Beirut from 1963 - 1966. He was assigned to Moscow, first as assistant administrative officer from 1967 to 1968, and then political officer from 1968 - 1969. Mr. Anderson returned to the US in 1969 to become the Soviet desk officer until 1971, when he was assigned as Egyptian desk officer. He left the US in 1974 to serve as the political counselor in Rabat, Morocco until 1978.

He was named special assistant to the senior adviser to the President and Secretary of State on Middle East and Soviet Affairs. From 1978 to 1982, he served as deputy chief of mission in Sofia, Bulgaria. From 1982 to 1986, he was the deputy chief of mission in Tunisia.

In 1986, Anderson was appointed United States Ambassador to the Republic of Sudan, and held this post until 1989. He was involved in the famine relief efforts during that time. He remained in the post until 1989.

== Personal life ==
Anderson is married to the former Mary (Bonnie) McIlvaine, has three children, and resides in the Washington D.C. area. Anderson speaks English, Arabic, French, Russian, Spanish, Ukrainian, Bulgarian, and Swedish.

== Bibliography ==
Anderson is the author of Sudan in Crisis:The Failure of Democracy. The book was reviewed in Foreign Affairs, Christian Science Monitor, Arab Studies Quarterly, and the International Journal of African Historical Studies.

Diplomatic posts
Preceded by Hume Horan	United States Ambassador to Sudan; 1989–1992	Succeeded by James Richard Cheek
