= Attack on the Saudi Embassy in Khartoum =

1973 hostage crisis at the Saudi Embassy in Khartoum, Sudan by Palestinian militants

- The location of Khartoum, Sudan
- Location: Khartoum, Sudan
- Date: 1 March 1973; 53 years ago
- Target: Saudi Embassy
- Attack type: Hostage-taking
- Deaths: 2 US diplomats 1 Belgian diplomat
- Perpetrator: Black September claimed responsibility
- No. of participants: 8 Palestinian militants

An attack on the Saudi embassy in Khartoum took place on 1 March 1973. It was carried out by the Black September Organization. Ten diplomats from several countries were taken hostage. After President Richard Nixon stated that he refused to negotiate with terrorists, and insisted that "no concessions" would be made, one Belgian and two U.S. hostages were killed.

== Attack ==
On 1 March 1973, the Saudi embassy in Khartoum, Sudan was giving a formal reception, and George Curtis Moore, chargé d'affaires at the American embassy, was the guest of honor as he was due to be reassigned from his post. Palestinian gunmen burst into the embassy, and took Moore hostage, as well as fellow American Cleo Allen Noel, a Belgian diplomat, and two others.

Eight masked men from Black September entered the building and fired shots in the air, detaining ten hostages:

- Cleo A. Noel Jr., the US Ambassador to Sudan
- Sheikh Abdullah al Malhouk, the Saudi Arabian Ambassador to Sudan, and his wife and their four children
- George Curtis Moore, US Deputy Chief of Mission to Sudan
- Guy Eid, Belgian Chargé d'affaires to Sudan
- Adli al Nasser, Jordanian Chargé d'affaires to Sudan
- Jasim Bourisly, the State of Kuwait Ambassador to Sudan

The morning after the hostages had been taken, the gunmen demanded the release of numerous Palestinians held in Israeli prisons, as well as the release of members of the Baader-Meinhof Group, and the release of Sirhan Sirhan, the assassin of former U.S. Attorney General and presidential candidate Robert F. Kennedy. However, they revised their demands and insisted that ninety Arab militants being held by the Jordanian government must be freed within 24 hours or the hostages would be killed. At one point they demanded an aircraft for reasons unknown at the time.

The US embassy marines were fully prepared to storm the Saudi embassy to retrieve the hostages by any means necessary. George Thompson (First Secretary of the US Embassy) was the American in charge on the ground (he did not attend the reception because he had to go to his son's parent-teacher conference that evening.) He was instructed by Washington to hold them back because of the diplomatic implications of American soldiers invading Saudi sovereign soil in the foreign country of Sudan. This was something the Sudanese had to take care of themselves.

In a news conference on 2 March, President Richard Nixon stated that the United States would "not pay blackmail". Nixon seemed to believe that the gunmen would give themselves up in exchange for safe passage as others had done when storming the Israeli embassy in Bangkok a year earlier.

After twelve hours, the gunmen stated that they had killed Noel, Moore and Eid, the three diplomats in their custody. They demanded a plane to take them and their hostages to the United States, which was rejected by both the Sudanese and American governments.

The Sudanese government continued to negotiate with the militants, and after three days the gunmen released the remaining hostages and surrendered to Sudanese authorities. In the aftermath it was found that the three deceased diplomats had been taken to the basement and killed.

Later it was determined that the terrorists planned to take the remaining hostages to Washington, line them up under a wing on US soil, and kill them all in front of the press.

== Aftermath ==
In October 1973, charges against two of the militants were dropped for insufficient evidence. A court of inquiry commenced trying the remaining six in June 1974. The court sentenced the six to life imprisonment before their sentences were reduced to seven years. The US government unsuccessfully lobbied the Sudanese government to put them to death.

Sudanese President Gaafar Nimeiry was on an official trip abroad during the incident and condemned it in the strongest terms on his return, stating that the perpetrators rewarded Sudan, which had provided peaceful sanctuary to Palestinian refugees, with the disturbance of Sudan's internal peace. He decided to delegate the punishment of the perpetrators to their compatriots and handed the six to the custody of the Palestine Liberation Organization. The next day, the PLO sent the six to Egypt, where they were to serve their sentences. In protest of Sudan's handling of this situation, the United States withdrew its ambassador to Sudan and froze economic assistance to Sudan in June. A new US ambassador returned to Sudan in November that year, and aid resumed in 1976.

Three of the Black September militants disappeared from Egyptian custody and were never recaptured. The remaining three served out their sentences.

The United States also tried to prosecute Yasser Arafat in the United States for his role in the event. However, John R. Bolton, then assistant attorney general at the U.S. Department of Justice, concluded in 1986 that legal jurisdiction for trying Arafat was lacking, as the appropriate statutory laws were not yet in force in 1973.

In December 2006, the United States Department of State released documents claiming that Arafat and the Fatah party were aware of the plot before it was carried out, and had ordered the operation. The documents further alleged that US intelligence had sent a warning to the embassy beforehand, but it was not intercepted in time.

== See also ==
- John Granville
- Saudi Arabia–Sudan relations
