= William H. Weathersby =

American journalist and diplomat

William Henry Weathersby (November 30, 1914 – November 20, 2001) was an American journalist and diplomat who served as the American Ambassador to Sudan from October 20, 1965 until June 1967, when Sudan severed diplomatic relations with the United States.

Weathersby was born in Clinton, Mississippi. His father William Henington Weathersby authored A history of educational legislation in Mississippi from 1798 to 1860.

He attended Mississippi Southern College, the University of Missouri, and the National War College. He worked as a reporter at the Hattiesburg American in Hattiesburg, Mississippi, and The Times-Picayune in New Orleans, and then for the Associated Press as a sports writer and editor. In 1942, while working for the AP, he joined the Navy and served in World War II, earning the Bronze Star.

In 1953, he joined the United States Information Agency (USIA), serving in Egypt and India before being made Ambassador to Sudan in 1965.

He left government service to take the newly created position of Vice President for Public Affairs at Princeton University. Brewer worked at Princeton for eight years. He returned to the USIA, where his last job for the government was Deputy Director for Policy and Plans.

He died in Sykesville, Maryland, in 2001.
