= Joseph N. Greene =

American diplomat

Joseph Nathaniel Greene (April 9, 1920 in New York - September 26, 2010 in Essex, Connecticut) was a US diplomat.

In 1942 entered the US foreign service. Served in junior diplomatic posts in Canada until 1944. In 1944 was posted in Algeria, which was recently recovered by the Allied Powers from Vichy France control. In 1944-1949 served in various positions in Italy. Served as US representative in Egypt from February 1972 to July 1973. Over the years he also had postings to Singapore, Germany, the United Kingdom and India.
