= Alan W. Lukens =

American diplomat (1924–2019)

Alan Wood Lukens (February 12, 1924 – January 5, 2019) was an American diplomat who served as the ambassador to People's Republic of the Congo from 1984 to 1987 and held other diplomatic posts throughout Africa. He died in January 2019 at the age of 94.

== Early life ==
Lukens was born in Philadelphia, Pennsylvania, son of Edward and Francis (Day) Lukens. He attended the Episcopal Academy, continuing his education at Princeton University, Class of 1946. He did not actually graduate until 1948 because he interrupted his studies to join the army.

He served in the Second World War in the 20th Armored Division, landed in Europe in January 1945 and experienced bitter fighting in the Rhine valley. His division was involved with the Liberation of Dachau concentration camp on April 29, 1945.

== Foreign Service ==
He joined the Foreign Service in 1951 and was Vice consul in Istanbul from 1952 to 1953; Charge d' affaires in the Central African Republic from 1960–1961, in Paris from 1961–1963, and in Morocco from 1963–1965; Deputy chief of mission in Dakar from 1967–1970, in Nairobi from 1970-1972, and in Copenhagen from 1975–1978. Lukens retired from the State Department in 1993. President of the 20th Armored Division association and commander of American Legion Post 136 in Greenbelt, Maryland.

Diplomatic posts
Preceded by Kenneth L. Brown	United States Ambassador to the People's Republic of the Congo; 1984–1987	Succeeded by Leonard G. Shurtleff
