= Umma Party (Zanzibar) =

1963–1964 political party in Zanzibar

- Leader: Abdulrahman Muhammad Babu
- Founded: 1963
- Dissolved: 8 March 1964
- Split from: Zanzibar Nationalist Party
- Merged into: Afro-Shirazi Party
- Ideology: Zanzibari nationalism Marxism; Scientific socialism Arab socialism Republicanism; Arab interests
- Political position: Far-left

The Umma Party was a socialist political party in Zanzibar. It was founded in 1963 by disaffected socialist Arabs from the ruling Zanzibar Nationalist Party. It was led by Abdulrahman Muhammad Babu and supported the Afro-Shirazi Party during the 1964 Zanzibar Revolution. Babu was made Minister of External Affairs following the revolution. The party merged into the Afro-Shirazi Party on 8 March 1964.

== Bibliography ==
- Bakari, Mohammed Ali (2001), The Democratisation Process in Zanzibar, GIGA-Hamburg, ISBN 3-928049-71-2.
- Speller, Ian (2007), "An African Cuba? Britain and the Zanzibar Revolution, 1964." (PDF), Journal of Imperial and Commonwealth History, 35 (2): 1–35, doi:10.1080/03086530701337666, S2CID 159656717.
