= Robert E. Whitehead =

American diplomat

Robert E. Whitehead (born 1950) is the former US Chargé d'Affaires in Gabon, as well as Ambassador to the Togolese Republic (2012–2015) and Chief of Mission in Khartoum, Sudan (until July 2011 when the Republic of South Sudan became an independent country). He served as the first American Consul-General to Juba, South Sudan in 2006.

== Biography ==
Whitehead graduated from Taylor University (1972) and earned an M.A. in English Literature and linguistics from Southern Illinois University Carbondale, where he was a graduate fellow.,

== Career ==
After 33 years in the Foreign Service, Whitehead retired in 2015. Since then, he's been called back several times to serve as Chargé d'Affaires at the Embassy in Burundi (2016), six months as Chargé d'Affaires at the Embassy in Kinshasa (2017) and four months as Counselor at the Embassy in Bangui, Central African Republic (2018). He served as Chargé d'Affaires in Gabon and to São Tomé and Príncipe in 2019.

== See also ==
- List of current ambassadors of the United States
