= George Curtis Moore =

American diplomat (1925–1973)

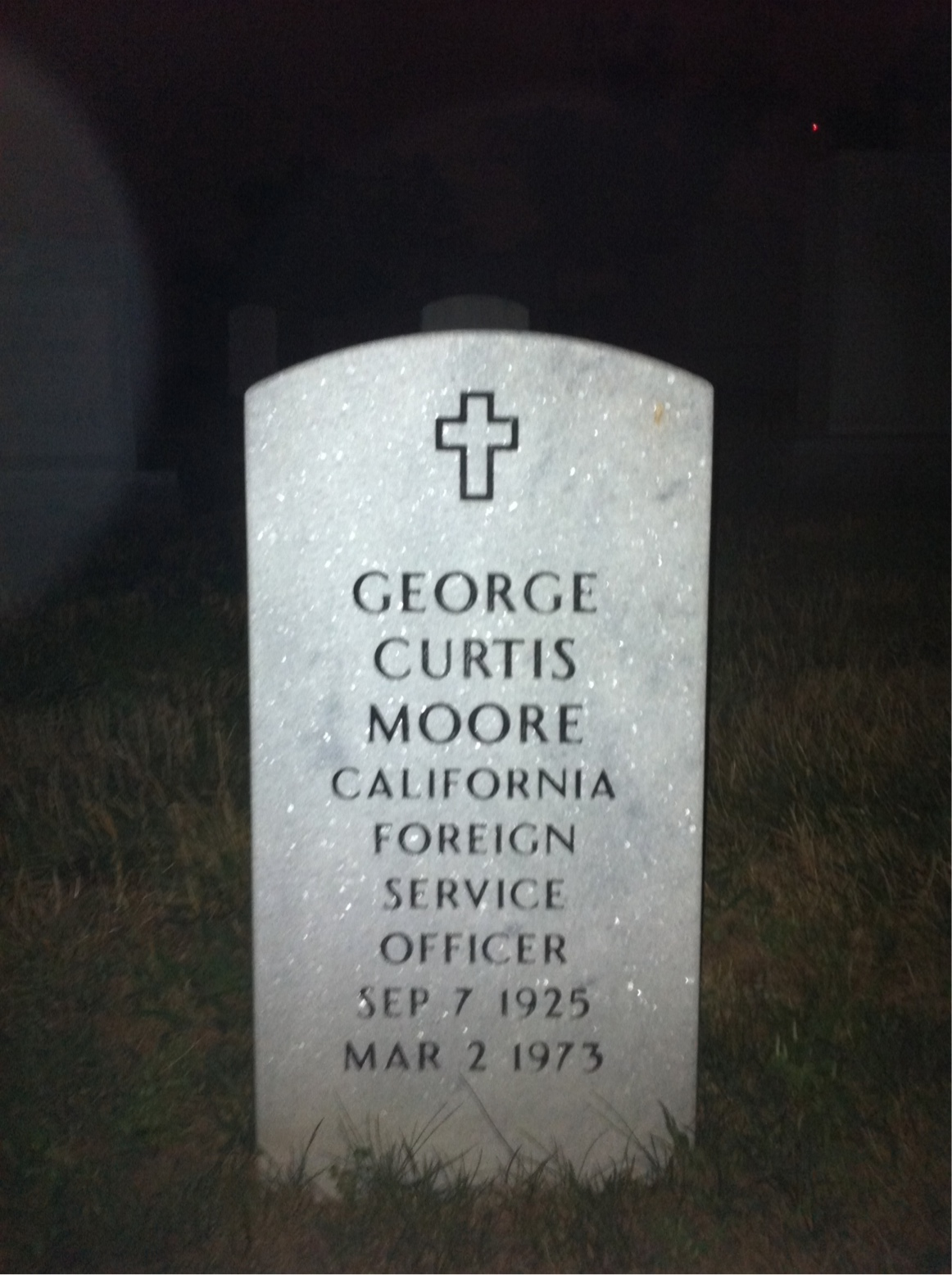
Grave at Arlington National Cemetery

George Curtis Moore (September 7, 1925 – March 2, 1973) was an American diplomat who was assassinated during a terrorist attack on the Saudi embassy in Khartoum, Sudan.

== Diplomatic career in Sudan ==
Moore was the principal foreign service officer in the United States Interest Section in Khartoum. The U.S. Embassy closed in 1967 during the Six-Day War. A U.S. Interest Section was established in the Netherlands embassy. Moore, a career foreign service officer, was assigned to the U.S. Interest Section as Principal Officer in July, 1969. He was an Arabist by training.

Upon the re-opening of the U.S. Embassy on July 25, 1972, Moore became Chargé d'Affaires ad interim, which is the title given to the person acting as interim ambassador.

== Assassination ==
On March 1, 1973, Palestinian terrorists with Black September stormed the Saudi Embassy during a farewell reception for Moore. Several ambassadors, including the Soviet, British, and French ambassadors and the Papal Nuncio, escaped. The French ambassador escaped by climbing the embassy walls. The next day, Moore was shot to death. Newly arrived U.S. Ambassador Cleo A. Noel, Jr. and Belgian Chargé d'Affaires Guy Eid were also murdered. The terrorists surrendered and were sentenced to jail. They were deported prior to serving their sentences.

Moore is buried at Arlington National Cemetery.

== See also ==
- List of assassinated people
