= William D. Brewer =

American diplomat (1922-2009)

Ambassador William Dodd Brewer (April 4, 1922 in Middletown, Connecticut – February 10, 2009 in Hingham, Massachusetts) was the American Ambassador to Mauritius from 1970 to 1973 and then Ambassador to the Sudan from 1973 to 1977.

Brewer graduated from the Taft School and Williams College. He graduated from the Fletcher School of Law and Diplomacy in 1946 after having served overseas during World War II. Brewer worked in the Office of War Information in Washington, D.C., and then in the American Field Service, C Platoon, 485th Company, attached to the British 8th Army, “seeing action at the Rapido River and Monte Cassino in Italy.”

Brewer retired from the Foreign Service in 1978 and was appointed the Stuart Chevalier Professor of Diplomacy and World Affairs at Occidental College where he taught and also chaired the Department of World Affairs until 1986. When he retired, he first lived in Falmouth, Massachusetts, before moving to Hingham.
