= Donald K. Petterson =

American diplomat (born 1930)

Donald K. Petterson (born November 17, 1930) is an American diplomat, and a career United States Foreign Service officer.

An African affairs specialist, during his career Petterson had overseas postings in Mexico, Zanzibar, Nigeria, Sierra Leone, and South Africa, and was US Ambassador to Somalia, Tanzania, and Sudan. He also served as an interim chargé d'affaires in Zimbabwe and Liberia and had postings in the State Department when not serving overseas.

== Early life ==
Petterson was born in Huntington Park, California. His family moved to Pismo Beach when he was three, and he later reported having an idyllic childhood there, roaming the beach and the hills. When he was thirteen, the family moved to San Luis Obispo, where he attended high school.

In July 1948, aged seventeen, he joined the United States Navy "to see the world." Having opted for the aviation branch, he trained at the Airman’s Fundamentals School at the Naval Air Station, Millington, Tennessee, and then at the Lakehurst Naval Air Station in New Jersey. His first ship was the USS General William Mitchell, on which he saw active service in the Korean War and took part in the evacuation of 100,000 United Nations troops and some 90,000 Korean civilians from Hungnam on December 24, 1950. Petterson stayed in the navy until July 1952, by which time he was a petty officer and had gained a pilot's license. After discharge, he attended the University of California, Santa Barbara, where he was on the football team. He graduated BA in 1956 in physical education.

From 1958 to 1959, Petterson was a personnel analyst at the California State Personnel Board in Los Angeles. From 1959 to 1960 he was a teaching assistant at his university, while studying for a master's degree in political science.

He graduated MA in 1960 and joined the Foreign Service the same year.

== Foreign Service career ==
Petterson was first posted as a vice consul in Mexico City, from 1961 to 1962. He had some months of training in Swahili in Washington D.C. before being assigned to Zanzibar as vice consul, 1962–1963. He continued to serve there as consul in 1965.

In January 1964, while he was serving as an envoy in Zanzibar, he was caught up in the Zanzibar Revolution, when the Sultanate of Zanzibar was overthrown by the majority black Africans in the country. US Consul Frederick P. Picard III and Petterson were both arrested at gunpoint by the rebels when the US government would not recognize the new regime at once. American journalists were also arrested. The next day, the men were put on a plane and left the country. Many years later, Petterson told of these events in his book Revolution in Zanzibar (2004).

His next posting was as political officer at the US Embassy in Lagos, Nigeria, where he stayed until 1967.

From 1968 to 1970, Petterson was a personnel officer in the State Department. From 1970 to 1972, he was on a posting to Freetown, Sierra Leone, as counsellor for political and economic affairs, and became Deputy Head of Mission there. From 1972 to 1975, he was counsellor for political affairs in Pretoria, South Africa. He returned to the Washington, DC and the State Department, first serving as an international relations officer (1975 to 1977) and then as Director of the Office of South African Affairs (1977 to 1978).

Petterson was living in San Luis Obispo, California, in September 1978 when nominated by Jimmy Carter to serve as US Ambassador to Somalia. He was posted there from October 12, 1978, to December 30, 1982. After a period as a foreign affairs fellow at UCLA, from 1984 to 1986 he was deputy director of the Office of Management Operations in the State Department. His next overseas appointment was as Ambassador to Tanzania, between October 16, 1986, and December 26, 1989.

He was Director of the Liberia Task Force at the U.S. Department of State in 1990, and shortly after served as Acting Deputy Assistant Secretary of State for the Bureau of African Affairs. He was chargé d'affaires at the US Embassy in Harare, Zimbabwe, from 1990 to 1991.

In April 1992, Petterson was studying at the Foreign Service Institute in Arlington, Virginia, when he was nominated by George H. W. Bush as Ambassador to the Sudan. He was Ambassador Extraordinary and Plenipotentiary in Khartoum from June 15, 1992, to July 28, 1995, when he retired.

He was briefly recalled to serve as chargé d’affaires in Liberia from February to August, 1999.

In 2005, Petterson was appointed as chairman of the Abyei Borders Commission, with the task of settling the borders of Abyei, a district disputed between the Sudan and the newly self-governing South Sudan. He was one of the five independent experts tasked with presenting the Commission's final report. Among the other four was Douglas H. Johnson, an author of works on southern Sudan.

== Personal life ==
Petterson met his future wife in Mexico City in 1961, shortly after his arrival there, when she applied for a visa to visit the US. They married the same year and had a daughter by the end of his posting. They later had three more children.

== Selected publications ==
- Donald K. Petterson, "Somalia and the United States, 1977–1983: the New Relationship" in Gerald J. Bender, James Smoot Coleman, Richard L. Sklar, African Crisis Areas and U.S. Foreign Policy (1985), pp. 194–204
- Donald Petterson, Inside Sudan: Political Islam, Conflict, and Catastrophe, Westview Press, 2003, ISBN 978-0-8133-4111-8
- Donald Petterson, Revolution in Zanzibar: An American's Cold War Tale Westview, 2004, ISBN 978-0-8133-4268-9
