= Giris Rabinovitch =

Giris Frank Rabinovitch (July 23, 1947-November 15, 2020) was chief executive of Sager Group, a firm of property developers based in north London. Rabinovitch was of Canadian nationality, acquired as a result of his grandparents fleeing to Canada in the 1890s and early 1900s to escape the Tsarist pogroms in Russia. He started in property development in his 30s and is currently beginning a project in Islington's Upper Street of 500,000 square feet that will be known as "Islington Square".
