= British response to the Zanzibar Revolution =

Planned British military operations in 1964

Operations Parthenon, Boris, Finery and Shed
- Part of the aftermath of the Zanzibar Revolution
- Unguja and Pemba, the two main islands of Zanzibar
- Planned by: British Armed Forces
- Objective: Restore law and order in Zanzibar and prevent a coup by the Umma Party
- Date: 30 January 1964 – 23 September 1964

The United Kingdom made a number of plans to intervene in response to the Zanzibar Revolution. The operational constraints of sending troops over such long distances, the reluctance of the Kenyan government to weaken the British presence in their country, the reduction of Western presence in Zanzibar, and the strengthening of the political situation in Tanzania made intervention unlikely, and the plans were suspended in October 1964. A newly elected Labour government cancelled the final plan in December of that year.

== Background ==
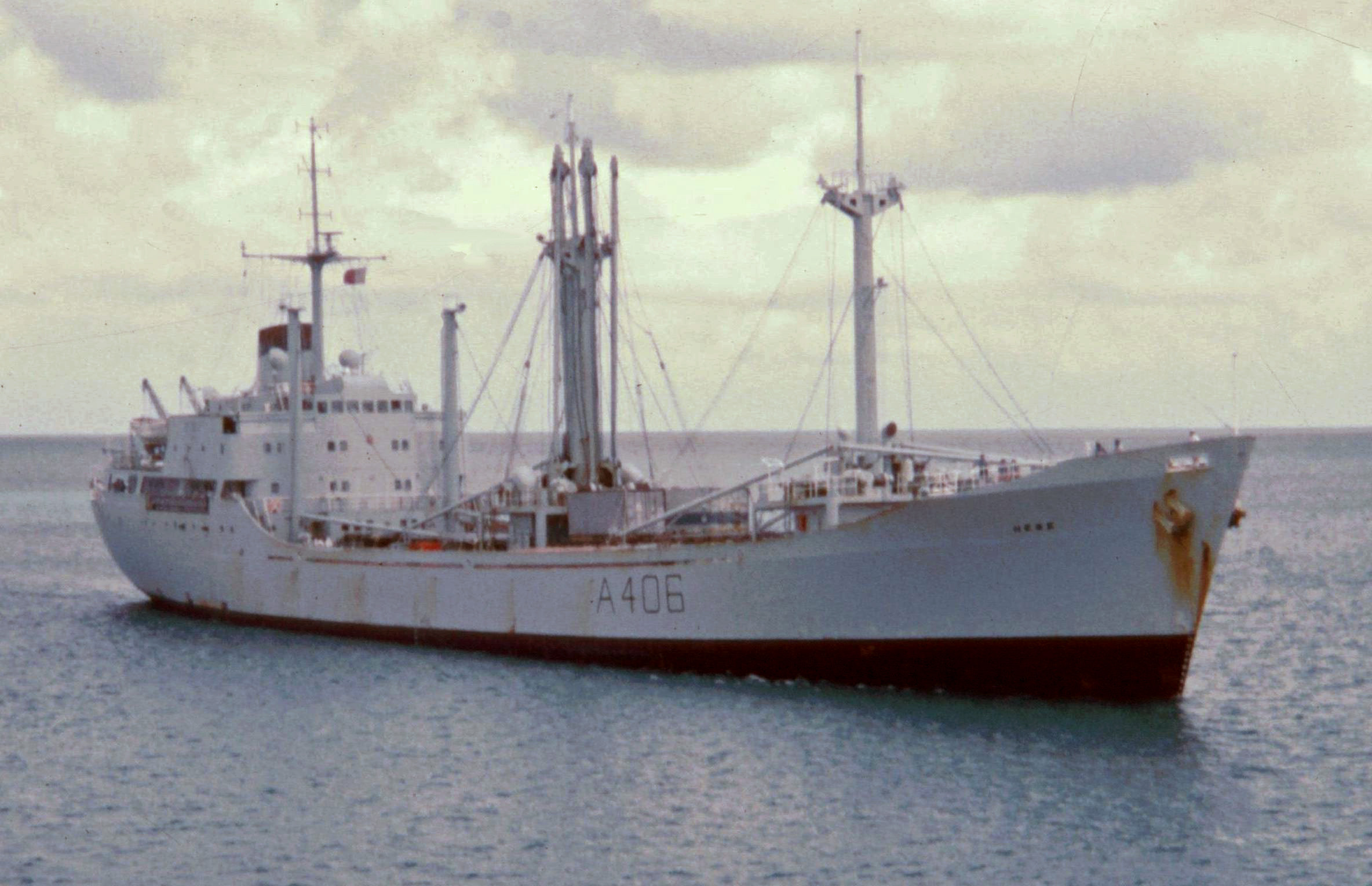
RFA Hebe

The Zanzibar Revolution occurred on 12 January 1964, when 600–800 mainly African men, led by John Okello and supported by the Afro-Shirazi and Umma Parties, overthrew Sultan Jamshid bin Abdullah and his largely Arab government. This resulted in civil disorder; looting of Arab-owned property; and organised killings of Arabs. The ASP, led by Abeid Karume, and the Umma Party, under Abdulrahman Mohamed Babu, formed the Revolutionary Council to govern the country. Following these events, several western governments, who suspected the revolutionaries had the backing of Cuba, the People's Republic of China and other communist countries, made plans for the evacuation of their citizens. The United States carried out an evacuation of 61 of its citizens, including 16 NASA employees at a satellite tracking station, on 13 January. Following the American evacuation, the US government stated that it recognised that Zanzibar lay within Britain's sphere of influence, and that it would not intervene further. The US did, however, urge that Britain co-operate with other African Great Lakes countries to restore order on the island.

The first British military presence in Zanzibar was HMS Owen, a survey ship diverted from the Kenyan coast, which arrived on the evening of 12 January. The frigate HMS Rhyl and Royal Fleet Auxiliary ship RFA Hebe joined Owen at Zanzibar on 15 January. The arrival of HMS Rhyl caused some concern to the revolutionary government, as she carried a company of troops from the first battalion of the Staffordshire Regiment, who had been sent to Zanzibar from Kenya due to inaccurate reports that security there was deteriorating rapidly. The Hebe exacerbated the situation, as she had just finished removing stores from the naval depot at Mombassa and was loaded with weapons and explosives; as a result, the Royal Navy refused to allow representatives from the Zanzibari government on board to search the ship, prompting rumours that she was an amphibious assault vessel.

These forces completed a partial evacuation of British citizens from the island on 17 January. Shortly after this, HMS Rhyl was dispatched to Tanganyika with the Staffordshire Regiment company to quell riots by the Tanganyika Army; HMS Owen collected a company of Gordon Highlanders to replace them.

== Timeline of plans ==
=== Operation Parthenon ===
On 30 January, the British Commanders Committee of East Africa authorised Operation Parthenon, whose objective was to restore law and order in Zanzibar should the Revolutionary Council fail to do so. Specifically, there was a concern that the radical left-wing Umma Party, supported by Okello's armed militia, would oust the more moderate members of the ASP from government and seize control.

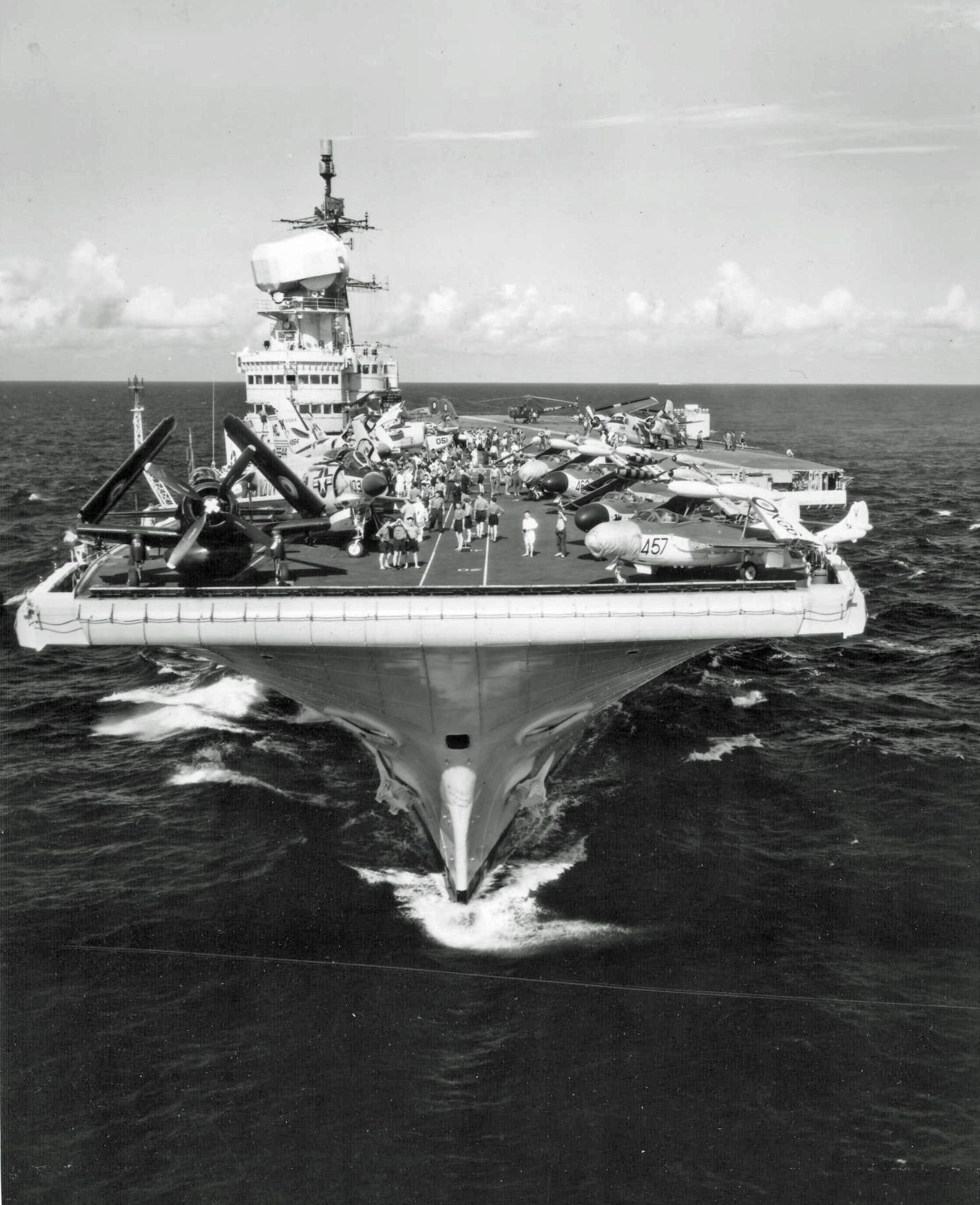
HMS Victorious (R38) in 1959

Operation Parthenon would have been a full-scale assault on the revolutionary forces defending Zanzibar to prevent the Umma Party from cementing its control of the island. It would have involved forces far in excess of previous plans, which concentrated on the evacuation and protection of European citizens. The operation would have involved the landing of British land forces by parachute and helicopter on the island of Unguja to secure the airport, before repeating the process on Pemba. The operation plans required a maximum of two aircraft carriers, three destroyers, Owen, 13 helicopters and 21 transport or reconnaissance aircraft. The land forces would have been provided by the second battalion of the Scots Guards, 45 Commando of the Royal Marines and one company of the second battalion of the Parachute Regiment. If it was carried out, Parthenon would have been the largest British airborne and amphibious operation since the Suez Crisis. The two carriers selected for the operation were HMS Centaur and HMS Victorious, which were transferred to the region in readiness. With the revelation, around 20 February, that communist troops may have trained the Zanzibar revolutionaries, the British planners decided that a different mix of forces was required for the task, and Operation Parthenon was replaced by Operation Boris.

=== Operation Boris ===
The British had identified Unguja, Zanzibar's southern island, as the main base of revolutionary power, whilst Pemba, to the north, was less affected. Thus, Operation Boris would commence with a parachute assault on Unguja's airfield, launched from pre-existing British airfields in Kenya, with troops securing Unguja before repeating the tactic on Pemba. However, the success of Boris was not assured, as it was recognised by the planners that any unilateral intervention by Britain against Zanzibar would cause a "strong adverse reaction" in Kenya. Britain had previously informed Kenya, Uganda and Tanganyika that if they requested British intervention in Zanzibar then it would be forthcoming but no such requests were received. Furthermore, the Kenyan government had stated that its clearance for British troops to move freely in Kenya did not extend to any intervention in Zanzibar. In any case, the security of British forces in Kenya could not be guaranteed if there was local opposition to the intervention and Zanzibari forces would likely be informed of any impending attack by sympathetic Kenyans. With this in mind, the Defence Council replaced Boris on 9 April with Operation Finery, an amphibious helicopter assault.

=== Operation Finery ===
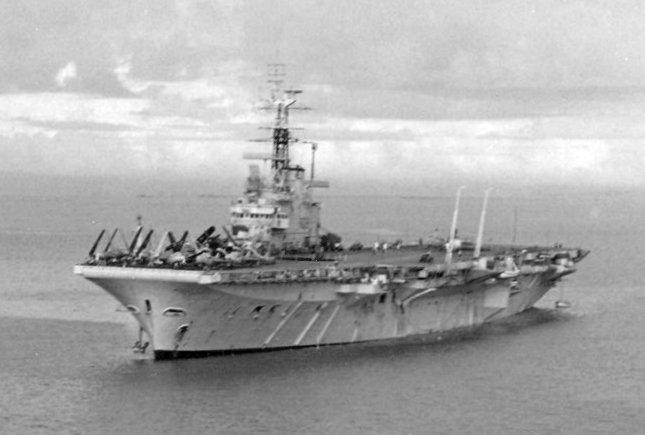
HMS Bulwark (R08) in 1958

Finery would have involved a helicopter assault on Unguja, the main base of revolutionary power, by Royal Marines from the commando carrier HMS Bulwark. The plan circumvented the need to operate from Kenya, where secrecy could not be guaranteed, and the government did not support intervention. It would take 14 days for Finery to launch once ordered, since Middle East operations required the Bulwark. To provide a more immediate response, plans were put in place for a smaller scale operation, which could be launched within 24 hours, should evacuation of remaining British citizens in Zanzibar be required. The merger of Zanzibar with Tanganyika to form Tanzania on 23 April may have provided the catalyst for the Umma Party to attempt a coup, and so from around this date, Finery was supported by Operation Shed: an airlift of a battalion of troops, accompanied by scout cars, to seize Unguja's airfield and protect Abeid Karume's government. The expected coup did not occur, and Finery was scrapped on 29 April 1964, although Operation Shed remained in place.

=== Operation Shed ===
Shed would have entailed the airlift of a battalion of British troops to Unguja, the main base of revolutionary power, to provide support to Karume and any forces loyal to him. The primary objectives were to seize the airfield and other strategic locations, protect Karume and his government, protect British and European citizens and to disarm any forces which were a threat to Karume. The operation was planned on the basis that troops would only be sent with the agreement of Karume, and that their disembarkation would be unopposed. The Commonwealth Relations Office had sought to persuade the Nigerian government to support Shed with additional troops, but had been turned down.

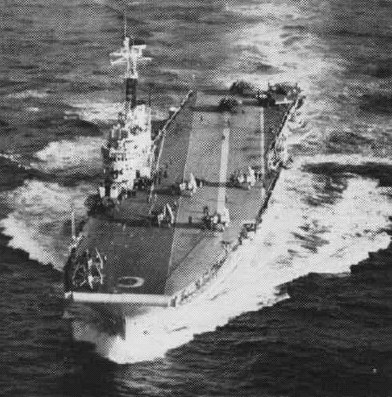
HMS Centaur in 1955

By 29 April, the danger of a coup had passed, so Operation Finery was scrapped and Shed stepped down to 24 hours readiness. On 21 May, the Chiefs of Staff acknowledged that Karume's agreement would probably not be gained, and that a landing may be opposed. Intelligence sources also stated that Karume's 300-strong police force were now outnumbered by other security forces of unknown loyalties, and that elements of the Zanzibari Army and a Soviet training team guarded the airfield by night. The Zanzibari army was known to be in possession of light anti-aircraft guns, heavy machine guns, 120 mm mortars and 57 mm anti-tank guns.

Karume's police were also expected to side with the army against any foreign intervention unless specifically ordered not to by Karume. A 300 strong Tanganyikan police unit was already on the island to keep the peace, and was expected to support the British intervention; however, it was of negligible use as a fighting unit. In light of this information, Shed was modified on 9 June to an airborne assault by Royal Marine commandos from HMS Centaur, which would then be supported by the landing of the battalion and armoured cars from Kenya. Despite these modifications, the Minister of Defence, Peter Thorneycroft, stated that losses amongst British and Zanzibari forces would likely be high if the plan went ahead. The continuing presence of 87 British citizens and 40 "friendly nationals" in the country also complicated matters, as British troops would be expected to protect these civilians from violence. Thus Shed was replaced by Plan Giralda around 23 September 1964.

=== Plan Giralda ===
Plan Giralda
- Planned by: British Armed Forces
- Objective: Prevent a coup by the Umma Party against Tanzanian president Julius Nyerere
- Date: 23 September 1964 – October 1964

Since the revolution, Zanzibar had merged with the African mainland country of Tanganyika to form Tanzania, and Plan Giralda was designed as a means of intervention in case the Zanzibar-based Umma Party attempted a coup against President Julius Nyerere of Tanzania. In January, prior to the merger, Nyerere had requested British military assistance to quell a mutiny in Tanganyika, as he had spent two days hiding in a Catholic mission after the mutineers raided the State House.

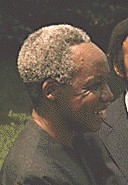
President Nyerere

The plan was to have used British troops from Aden and the Far East to launch a military intervention in Zanzibar. Giralda called for an infantry battalion and a tactical headquarters unit to be shipped from Aden to the British naval and air base on Gan in the Maldives, where they would rendezvous with a Royal Marines commando unit and vessels of the Royal Navy drawn from the Far East.

Because of the long distances involved, it was estimated that it would take 11 to 15 days for the entire force to reach Zanzibar following the initial order. Once the force had reached the island, it was capable of remaining embarked and out of sight of land for up to 15 days before operational efficiency would be compromised. One of the problems facing the plan was that President Nyerere's agreement had to be given for the operation to go ahead, and the 11- to 15-day delay between this agreement and the arrival of troops may have weakened his resolve for action. If, however, the troops were sent in anticipation of this agreement they could only remain on board the ships for a finite time before they would have to be publicly disembarked. Resource constraints meant that an amphibious assault force with attendant ships could not be kept permanently ready in the theatre, as this capability had been ruled out in the 1961 strategy paper "British strategy in the 1960s".

Giralda would have relied on follow on forces drawn from bases in Kenya, or transported through Kenya from Aden, to maintain security after the initial assault. The movement of these troops was subject to the agreement of the Kenyan government, and so put the safety of British troops at the discretion of a foreign government. Similar political problems had affected the reinforcement of Kuwait in 1961. The support of the Kenyan government might have been difficult to obtain, as the reinforcements may have come from the British garrison there, which had recently been required to quell mutinies in the Kenyan army.

By the autumn of 1964, Western interests in Zanzibar were practically non-existent, and in October, the British Chiefs of Staff were informed that Nyerere was very unlikely to request intervention, and as a result, the plan was suspended.

== Aftermath ==
The 1964 British general election brought in a Labour government, which scrapped Giralda in December. The government decided not to inform Nyerere that it no longer considered itself bound to respond to any request for intervention.

== See also ==
- British responses to the anti-Jewish pogroms in the Russian Empire
- Foreign relations of the United Kingdom
