= Victims of Chișinău Pogrom =

Memorial to the victims of Chișinău pogrom

Victims of Chișinău Pogrom Monument
- Monumentul Victimelor Pogromului de la Chișinău
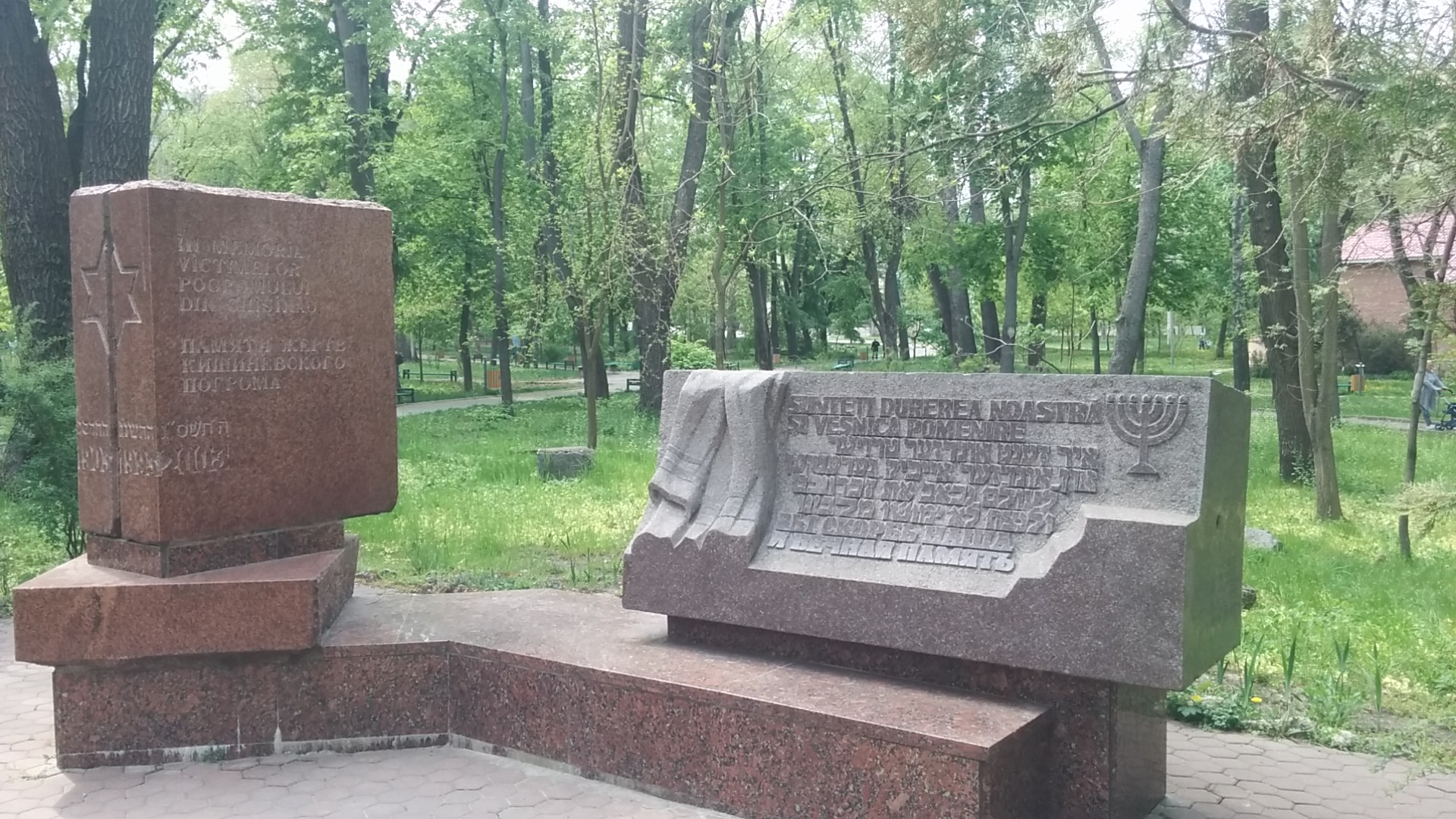
- The monument in the Alunelul park
- Interactive map of Victims of Chișinău Pogrom Monument
- Location: Chișinău, Moldova
- Coordinates: 47°2′16.57″N 28°48′16.42″E
- Designer: Simeon Shoihet
- Type: memorial stone
- Material: gray marble
- Beginning date: 1993
- Completion date: 2003
- Opening date: 2003
- Dedicated to: Victims of Chișinău pogrom

The Victims of Chișinău Pogrom Monument (Romanian: Monumentul Victimelor Pogromului de la Chișinău) is a memorial stone to the victims of Chișinău pogrom, unveiled 1993 in Alunelul Park Chișinău, Moldova. It consists of two marble blocks, one in 1993 and one in 2003.

== Chișinău pogrom ==
The Chișinău pogroms (more commonly known as the Kishinev pogroms) took place in 1903 and 1905. The victims were buried in the Jewish cemetery, but in 1959, this part of the cemetery was destroyed to make way for a park facing Calea Ieșilor Street.

== Creation history ==
The initial monument was erected in 1993, on the 90th anniversary of the pogrom. This memorial stone is divided into two parts by a Star of David. There is an inscription in four languages (Hebrew, Yiddish, Romanian, and Russian), that says: "In memory of the victims of the Kishinev pogrom 1903–1993."

In 2003, on the 100th anniversary, 16 blocks of gray granite were added. The inscription says: “We will bear your memory in pain forever and you will always be in our hearts.”

== Gallery ==
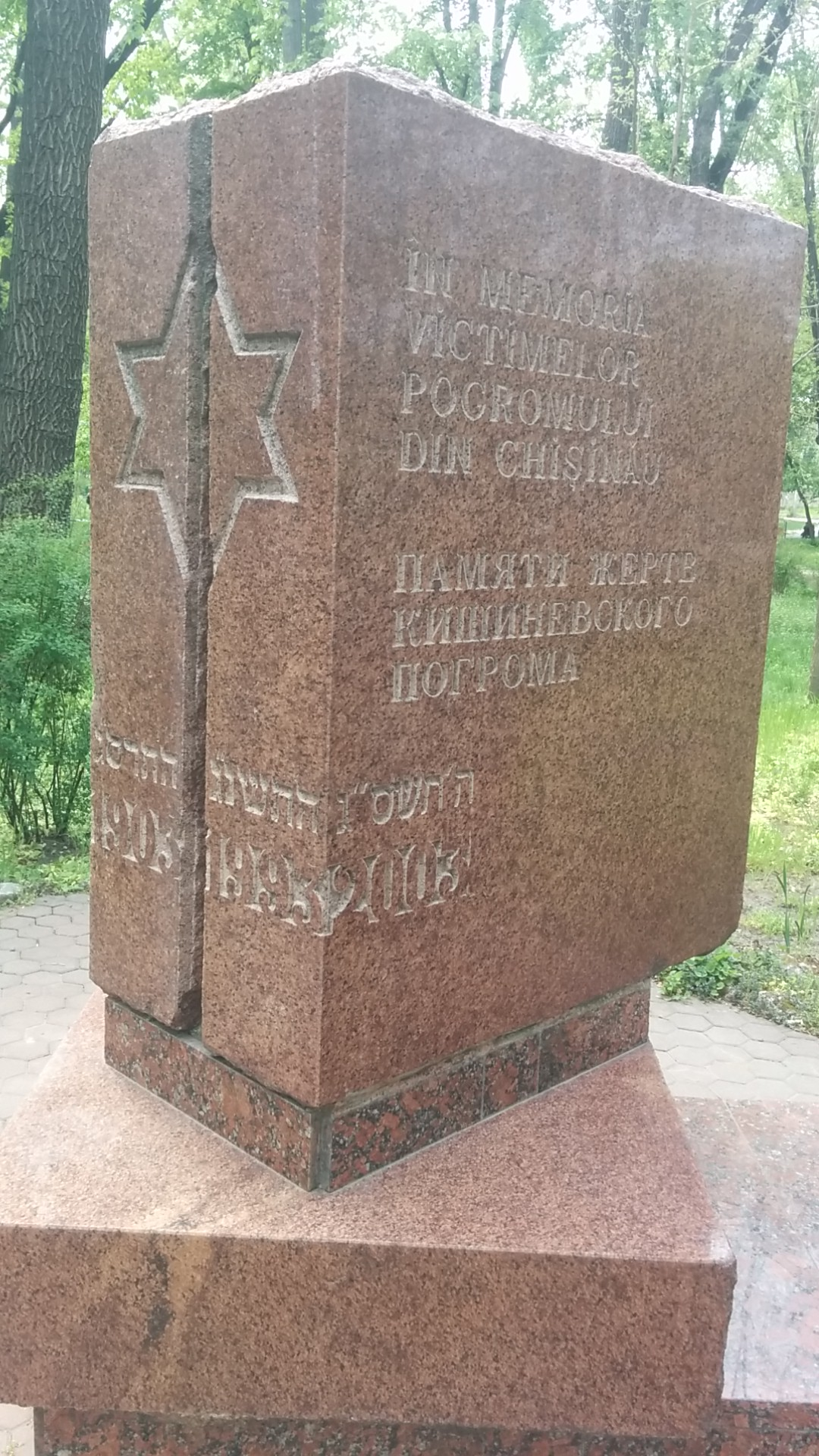

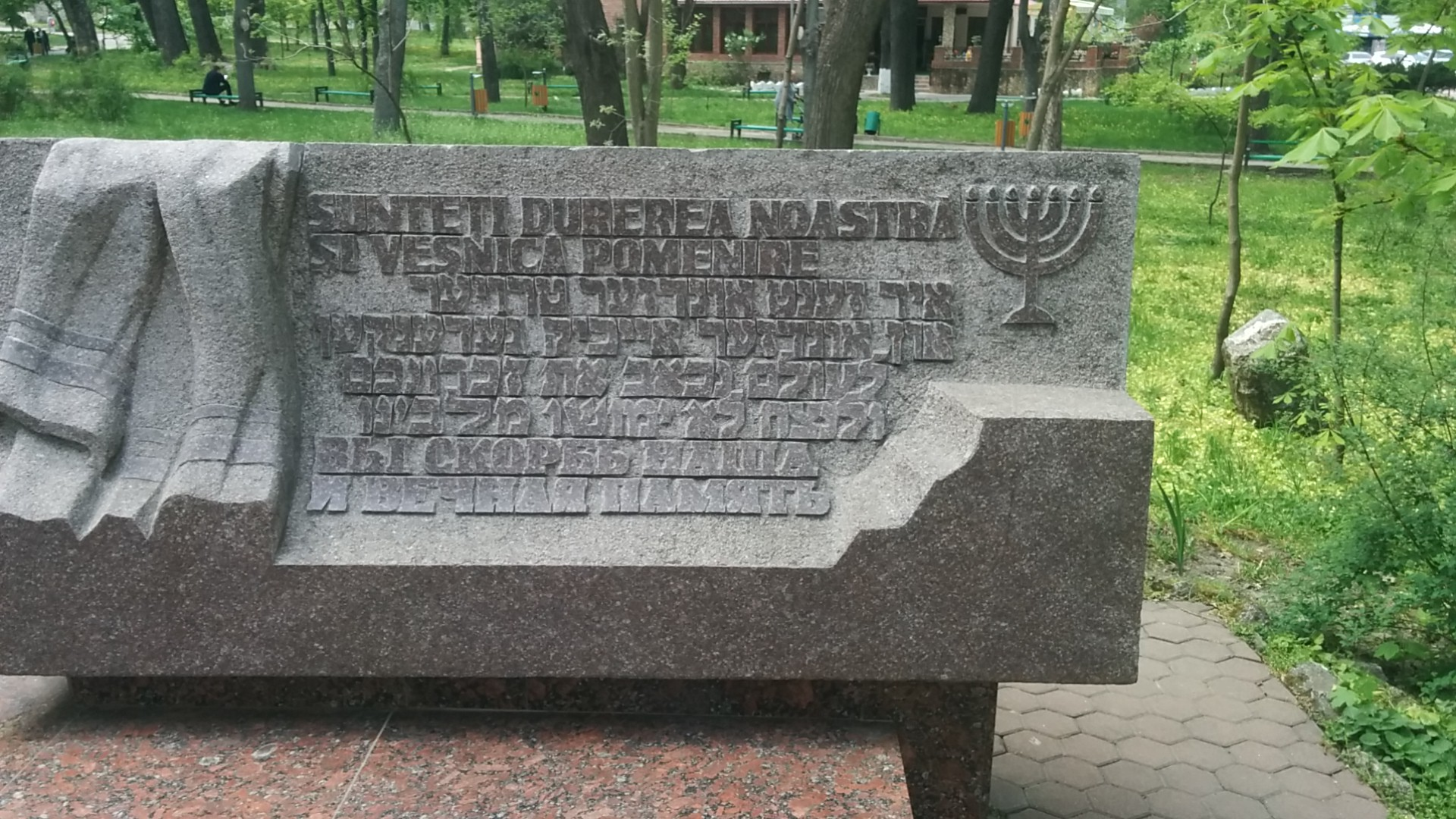
