= Second Kishinev pogrom =

1905 pogrom in Chișinău

The second Kishinev pogrom took place on 19–20 October 1905 in Kishinev (now Chișinău), two and a half years after the first Kishinev pogrom. It was part of the wave of pogroms that swept across the Russian Empire after the tsar's October Manifesto in the wake of the abortive Revolution of 1905. 19 Jews were murdered and 55 wounded.

The pogrom started as a right-wing demonstration against the tsar's Manifesto, which turned into an attack on the Jewish quarter. The pogrom was resisted by Jewish self-defense groups, with partial success. Instrumental in organizing the self-defense was the Kishinev branch of Tze'irei Zion, who issued a circular calling Jewish youth to organize the resistance to violence. Between 1902 and 1905, the number of Jews in Kishinev decreased from about 60,000 to 53,000 (about 12%) due to emigration.

== See also ==
- Kishinev pogrom
- Victims of Chișinău Pogrom Monument
