= October Manifesto =

1905 document by Tsar Nicholas II on restructuring Russian civil rights and government

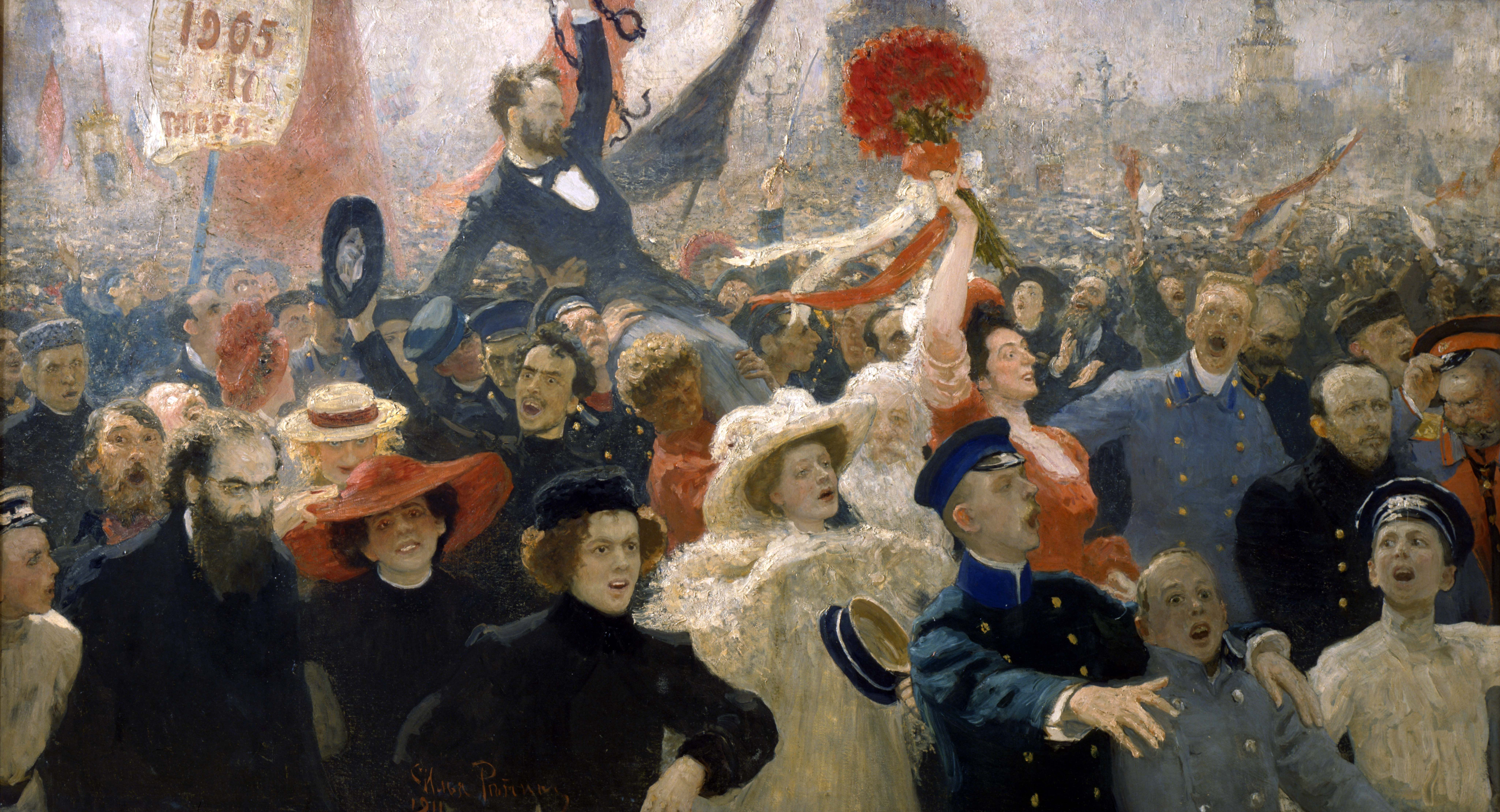
Demonstration 17 October 1905 by Ilya Repin (Russian Museum. St. Petersburg)

The October Manifesto (Russian: Октябрьский манифест, Манифест 17 октября), officially "The Manifesto on the Improvement of the State Order" (Манифест об усовершенствовании государственного порядка), is a document that served as a precursor to the Russian Empire's first Constitution, which was adopted the following year in 1906. The Manifesto was issued by Tsar Nicholas II, under the influence of finance minister Sergei Witte, on 30 October [O.S. 17 October] 1905 as a response to the Russian Revolution of 1905. Nicholas strenuously resisted these ideas, but gave in after his first choice to head a military dictatorship, Grand Duke Nicholas, threatened to shoot himself in the head if the Tsar did not accept Witte's suggestion. Nicholas reluctantly agreed, and issued what became known as the October Manifesto, promising certain civil rights and an elected parliament called the Duma, without whose approval no laws were to be enacted in Russia in the future. According to his memoirs, Witte did not force the Tsar to sign the October Manifesto, which was proclaimed in all the churches.

== Prelude ==
While France, Great Britain, and the United States had chosen democracy in one form or another, the Russian Empire maintained its ancient autocratic government, headed by the Tsar. Russia had in the early 1890s, under the guidance of Minister of Finance Sergei Witte, embarked on a state-led programme of industrialization through foreign investments and the imposition of tariffs.

However, the rapid growth in industry during this period was not met by political reform, leading an expanding working class to become heavily discontented. Nonetheless, peasants still formed 80% of the population and, despite the emancipation of the serfs by Tsar Alexander II, agrarian problems were still marked. Russia, remaining a mostly agricultural economy, created economic issues and conflict between the differing social classes, as well as the government of the Russian Autocracy. The conflict created by Russia’s economic and political issues climaxed in the months prior to October 1905, also known as the Russian Revolution of 1905. On 22 January 1905, peaceful protesters attempted to bring a petition to the Tsar, as was the tradition. However this protest was violently put down outside the Winter Palace when guards were ordered to fire on the protesters. The result of the violent revolt of the protest would be known as "Bloody Sunday". The violent reaction to the protest increased the tension throughout Russia further. Unrest amongst the Russian people followed Bloody Sunday. By the thousands people refused to go to work and general strike crippled the Empire. Unrest eventually spread to the Russian countryside where peasants began to burn their masters' manors as the Russian people revolted against the autocracy. With Russia’s communication, transportation and public services crippled by the strikes, Nicholas II was forced to act before he lost power completely.

== Nicholas II's opposition to reform ==
Although Russia was at a major standstill with violent revolts terrorizing the nation, Nicholas II still opposed any reforms that involved limiting the autocracy. Nicholas felt that it was not his place to limit a system created by his ancestors and is quoted as saying "I cannot squander a legacy that is not mine to squander." Nicholas could not bring himself to understand that the Russian people wished to limit his power, which he had increasingly used against them. This opposition towards the reform is of course argued to be due to his upbringing of autocratic beliefs.

== Provisions ==
The October Manifesto addressed the unrest application throughout the Russian Empire and pledged to grant certain civil liberties, including

- To grant to the population the essential foundations of civil freedoms based on the principles of genuine inviolability of the person, freedom of conscience, speech, assembly and association.
- Without postponing the scheduled elections to the State Duma, to admit to participation in the Duma (insofar as possible in the short time that remains before it is scheduled to convene) of all those classes of the population that now are completely deprived of voting rights; and to leave the further development of a general statute on elections to the future legislative order.
- To establish as an unbreakable rule that no law shall take effect without confirmation by the State Duma and that the elected representatives of the people shall be guaranteed the opportunity to participate in the supervision of the legality of the actions of our appointed officials.
- The Manifesto also introduced universal manhood suffrage in Russia which was common in some Western countries, such as France, Germany and the United States.

This document, although granting certain rights to the Russian people, did not guarantee that the Russian government would function in a democratic way. Instead, the Manifesto just stated that the people now had certain rights and a voice in legislation.

The freedom of religion clause outraged the Russian Orthodox Church because it allowed people to convert to evangelical Protestantism, which they denounced as heresy.

== The Duma ==
One provision of the Manifesto was the creation of a legislative body in Russia, which was intended to limit the power of the Autocrat in favour of the Russian people. The legislative body known as the Duma was flawed from its inception. One major flaw of the Duma was that the Tsar maintained the power to veto any legislation that he wished. The Duma was also weakened by the influence of the Russian bureaucracy, as well as the fact that the body could be disbanded by Nicholas if he and the Duma could not reach an agreement.

== Opposition ==
The October Manifesto divided opposition to the Emperor. The Kadets were appeased by the idea of having freedom of speech and a truly representative government, as was the Union of October 17 (informally known as the Octobrists).

== Effects ==
The Manifesto enjoyed a short-lived success. The strikes and much of the violence ended almost as soon as it was published. Enthusiasm swept the nation as people realised their new-found freedom and the idea of having representation in the government. This manifesto also sprouted the Octobrists.

However, some of the population opposed the reforms. October 19–20 marked the second Kishinev pogrom against the Jewish community there, which started as a protest against the Manifesto.

The immediate success of the Manifesto, however, was followed by a return to the cycle of strikes and violence as the autocracy gradually reaffirmed its power. Within months, executions of armed revolutionaries were numbering more than a thousand. The government began suppressing political parties; by 1906–07 much of Russia was under martial law. This was relaxed after the end of the revolution in 1907.

== See also ==
- Bibliography of the Russian Revolution and Civil War
- Outline of the Russian Revolutions of 1905 and 1917 and Civil War
- Index of articles related to the Russian Revolution and Civil War
