= List of prehistoric stylophoran genera =

This list of prehistoric stylophorans is an attempt to create a comprehensive listing of all genera from the fossil record that have ever been considered to be members of the stylophora, excluding purely vernacular terms. The list includes all commonly accepted genera, but also genera that are now considered invalid, doubtful (nomina dubia), or were not formally published (nomina nuda), as well as junior synonyms of more established names, and genera that are no longer considered stylophorans.

== Naming conventions and terminology ==
Naming conventions and terminology follow the International Code of Zoological Nomenclature. Technical terms used include:

- Junior synonym: A name which describes the same taxon as a previously published name. If two or more genera are formally designated and the type specimens are later assigned to the same genus, the first to be published (in chronological order) is the senior synonym, and all other instances are junior synonyms. Senior synonyms are generally used, except by special decision of the ICZN, but junior synonyms cannot be used again, even if deprecated. Junior synonymy is often subjective, unless the genera described were both based on the same type specimen.
- Nomen nudum (Latin for "naked name"): A name that has appeared in print but has not yet been formally published by the standards of the ICZN. Nomina nuda (the plural form) are invalid, and are therefore not italicized as a proper generic name would be. If the name is later formally published, that name is no longer a nomen nudum and will be italicized on this list. Often, the formally published name will differ from any nomina nuda that describe the same specimen.
- Nomen oblitum (Latin for "forgotten name"): A name that has not been used in the scientific community for more than fifty years after its original proposal.
- Preoccupied name: A name that is formally published, but which has already been used for another taxon. This second use is invalid (as are all subsequent uses) and the name must be replaced. As preoccupied names are not valid generic names, they will also go unitalicized on this list.
- Nomen dubium (Latin for "dubious name"): A name describing a fossil with no unique diagnostic features. As this can be an extremely subjective and controversial designation, this term is not used on this list.

== The list ==
Genus	Authors	Year	Status	Age	Location	Notes
Acuticarpus						
Allanicytidium						
Amygdalotheca						
Anatiferopsis						
Anomalocystites						
Archaeocothurnus						
Aspidocarpus						
Ateleocystites						
Australocystis						
Babinocystis						
Balanocystites						
Barrandeocarpus						
Basslerocystis						
Beryllia						
Bohemiaecystis						
Bokkeveldia						
Ceratocystis						
Chaivella						
Chauvelia						
Chauvelicystis						
Chinianocarpos						
Cothurnocystis						
Diamphidiocystis						
Domfrontia						
Enoploura						
Eumitrocystella						
Galliaecystis						
Guichenocarpos						
Hanusia						
Jaekelocarpus						
Kierocystis						
Kopficystis						
Lagynocystis						
Lyricocarpus						
Milonicystis						
Mitrocystella						
Mitrocystites						
Mongolocarpos						
Nanocarpus						
Nevadaecystis						
Notocarpos						
Occultocystis						
Ovocarpus						
Paranacystis						
Peltocystis						
Phyllocystis						
Placocystella						
Placocystites						
Prochauvelicystis						
Procothurnocystis						
Progalliaecystis						
Prokopicystis						
Protocystites						
Reticulocarpos						
Rhenocystis						
Scotiaecystis						
Spermacystis						
Tasmanicytidium						
Thoralicystis						
Victoriacystis						
Vizcainocarpus						
Willmanocystis						
Yachalicystis						

== See also ==
- List of prehistoric brittle stars
- List of prehistoric sea cucumbers
- List of crinoid genera
