= Saint-Chinian Formation =

Geologic formation in France

- Stratigraphic range: Tremadocian
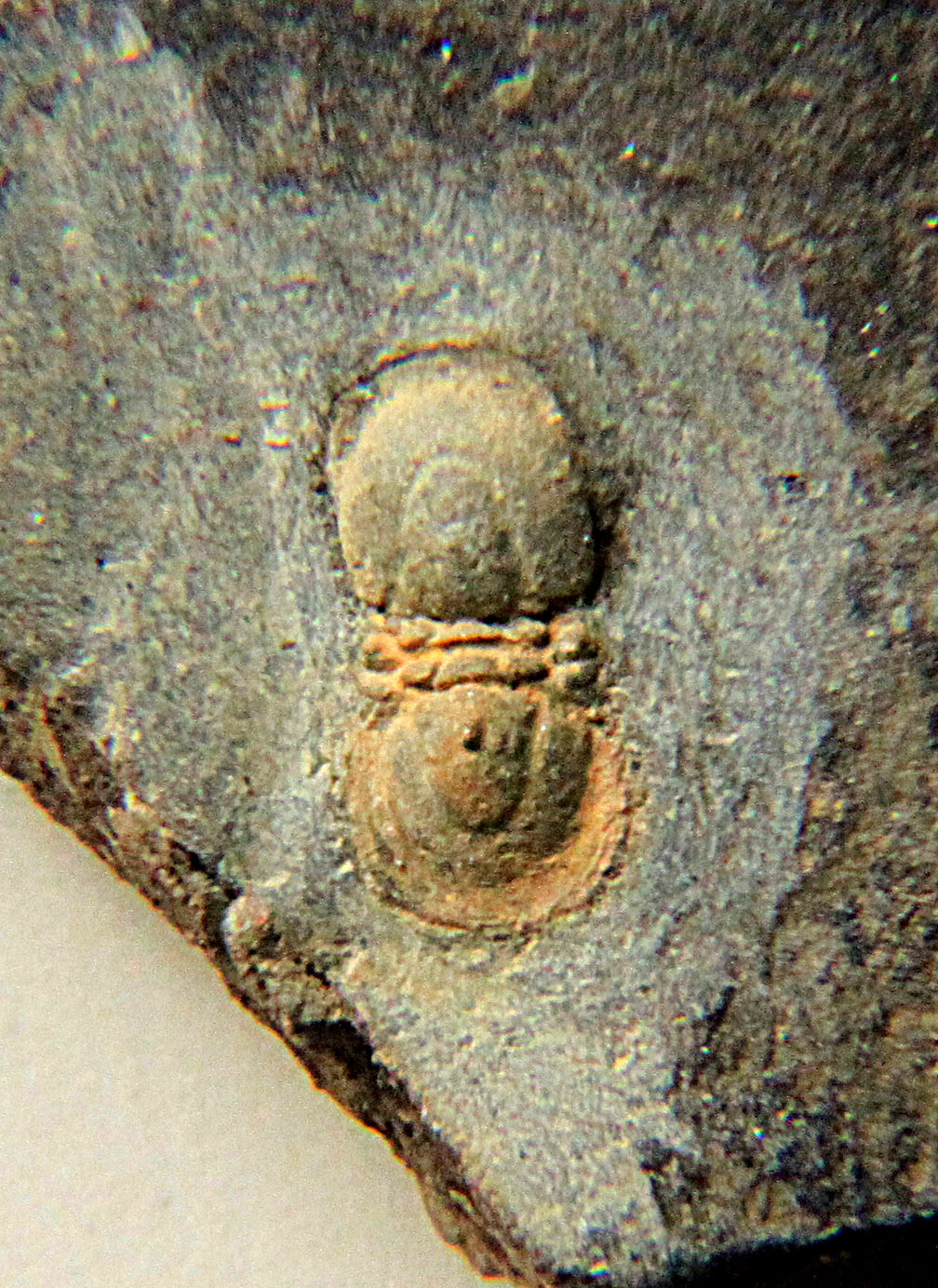
- Geragnostus mediterraneus
- Type: Geologic formation
- Underlies: La Maurerie Formation
- Overlies: La Dentelle Formation
- Thickness: around 500 m

Lithology
- Primary: Shale
- Other: Sandstone, Limestone

Location
- Coordinates: 43.418624°N 2.945366°E
- Region: Occitanie
- Country: France

Type section
- Named for: Saint-Chinian
- Saint-Chinian Formation (France)

The Saint-Chinian Formation is a geological formation composed of shales with limestone inclusions, dating from the Lower Ordovician (Tremadocian).

It is one of the six geological formations from the Saint-Chinian Cambro-Ordovician basin, comprising, from the most ancient to the most recent : La Dentelle Formation, Saint-Chinian Formation, La Maurerie Formation, Cluse de l'Orb Formation and Setso member, Foulon Formation and Landeyran Formation. This formation outcrops on the southern flanks of the Montagne Noire in Southern France.

The formation received its name from the small city of Saint-Chinian, a commune located in the Hérault department in Occitania.

It is dated from the biostratigraphic sub-zone characterized by Taihungshania miqueli and Asaphelina barroisi berardi.

== Paleoenvironment ==
The Saint-Chinian Formation was deposited in a deep-marine setting along the southern margin of the Montagne Noire during the Tremadocian (Early Ordovician). The succession is dominated by dark grey to black shales interbedded with fine-grained sandstones and thin limestone layers, interpreted as distal turbidites. These lithologies reflect sedimentation on an outer shelf to slope environment, characterized by low energy conditions and episodic gravity flows.

The thin nature of the silico-clastics deposits, the presence of slump structures, graded bedding, and synsedimentary deformation combined with a trilobite fauna dominated by members of the Asaphidae family, indicates periodic slope instability, possibly linked to tectonic activity. The fauna, including trilobites and cephalopods, suggests oxygenated bottom waters and an open marine setting.

Biogeographically, the assemblages show affinities with other Tremadocian faunas from northern Gondwana, including those of Morocco, Bohemia, and the Iberian Peninsula. The formation provides important data for regional paleogeographic reconstructions and for understanding early Ordovician biodiversification in peri-Gondwanan basins.

== Paleofauna ==
Shales of the Saint-Chinian Formation bears in certain areas accumulations of phosphated nodules, each potentially bearing a trilobite. Those are the so-called "schistes à gateaux".

=== Nautiloids ===
Genus	Species	Locality	Age	Notes	Images
Cyclostomiceras	C. thorali	Euloma filacovi Zone	Late Tremadocian	A cyclostomiceratid ellesmerocerid	
Saloceras	S. chinianense	Euloma filacovi Zone	Late Tremadocian	An eothinoceratid ellesmerocerid	
Saloceras	S. murvielense	Euloma filacovi Zone	Late Tremadocian	An eothinoceratid ellesmerocerid	
Saloceras	S. pradense	Taihungshania miqueli acme Subzone	Late Tremadocian	An eothinoceratid ellesmerocerid	
Rioceras	R. escandei	Euloma filacovi Zone; Asaphelina barroisi berardi and Taihungshania miqueli Subzone	Late Tremadocian	A rioceratid ellesmerocerid	
Felinoceras	F. constrictum	Euloma filacovi Zone	Late Tremadocian	A rioceratid ellesmerocerid	
Annbactroceras	A. martyi	Euloma filacovi Zone	Late Tremadocian	A baltoceratid orthocerid	
Annbactroceras	A. felinense	Euloma filacovi Zone	Late Tremadocian	A baltoceratid orthocerid	
Bactroceras	B. mourguesi	Euloma filacovi Zone	Late Tremadocian	A baltoceratid orthocerid	
Cochlioceras	C.? aff. roemeri	Euloma filacovi Zone; Asaphelina barroisi berardi and Taihungshania miqueli Subzone	Late Tremadocian	A baltoceratid orthocerid	
Thoraloceras	T. bactroceroides	Euloma filacovi Zone; Asaphelina barroisi berardi and Taihungshania miqueli Subzone	Late Tremadocian	A troedsonellid dissidocerid	
Lobendoceras	L. undulatum	Euloma filacovi Zone; Asaphelina barroisi berardi and Taihungshania miqueli Subzone	Late Tremadocian	A protocameroceratid endocerid	

=== Trilobites ===
Genus	Species	Locality	Age	Notes	Images
Paramegalaspis	P. immarginata	Prades-sur-Vernazobre	Late Tremadocian-Early Arenig	An asaphid	
Asaphellus	A. frequens	Prades-sur-Vernazobre	Late Tremadocian-Early Arenig	An asaphid	
Asaphellus	A.? sp.	Félines-Minervois	Late Tremadocian-Early Arenig	An asaphid	
Aocaspis	A. macrophtalma	La Rouvelane, près de Prades-sur-Vernazobre	Late Tremadocian-Early Arenig	An nileid	
Geragnostus	G. occitanus	Saint-Chinian	Early Arenig	A geragnostid	
Geragnostus	G. callavei	Saint-Chinian	Early Arenig	A geragnostid	
Geragnostus	G. pusio	Saint-Chinian	Early Arenig	A geragnostid	
Micragnostus	M. languedocensis	Saint-Chinian	Early Arenig	A micragnostid	
Trinodus	T. chinianensis	Saint-Chinian	Early Arenig	A trinodid	
Trinodus	T. corpulentus	Saint-Chinian	Early Arenig	A trinodid	
Trinodus	T. abruptus	Saint-Chinian	Early Arenig	A trinodid	
Trinodus	T. oviformis	Saint-Chinian	Early Arenig	A trinodid	

- Trilobites:
  Members from the Asaphida order and the Asaphidae family are commons :
  - Asaphelina barroisi barroisi,
  - Asaphelina barroisi berardi,
  - Niobella ligneresi,
  - Taihungshania miqueli,
  - Ampyx priscus,
  - Ampyxinella;
  The Agnostida order is present, with:
  - Arthrorhachis;
  Ptychopariida order:
  - Euloma filacovi,
  - Solenopleuropsis ribeiro;
  Phacopida order :
  - Platycalymene.

=== Echinoderms ===
Genus	Species	Locality	Age	Notes	Images
Arauricystis	A. primaeva			A cornute stylophoran	
Arauricystis	A. occitana			A cornute stylophoran	
Cothurnocystis	C. fellinensis			A cornute stylophoran	
Cothurnocystis	C. courtessolei			A cornute stylophoran	
Phyllocystis	P. blayaci			A cornute stylophoran	
Phyllocystis	P. crassimarginata			A cornute stylophoran	
Thoralicystis	T. griffei			A cornute stylophoran	
Trigonocarpus	T. singularis			A cornute stylophoran	
Chauvelicystis	C. spinosa			A cornute stylophoran	
Chauvelicystis	C. vizcainoi			A cornute stylophoran	
Galliaecystis	G. lignieresi			A cornute stylophoran	
Galliaecystis	G. ubaghsi			A cornute stylophoran	
Amygdalotheca	A. griffei			A cornute stylophoran	
Anatifopsis	A. trapeziiformis			A mitrate stylophoran	
Balanocystites	B. escandei			A mitrate stylophoran	
Peltocystis	P. cornuta			A mitrate stylophoran	
Vizcainocarpus	V. dentiger			A mitrate stylophoran	
Chinianocarpos	C. thorali			A mitrate stylophoran	
Minervaecystis	M. vidali			A solute homoistelean	
Balantiocystis	B. thorali			An eocrinoïd	
Aethocrinus	A. moorei			A cladide crinoïd	
Macrocystella	M. azaizi			A dichoporite rhombifere. Two subspecies are present : M. a. paucicristatus and M. a. multicristata	
Hemicystites	H. boehmi			A edrioasteroïd	
?Pyrgocystis	?P. sp.			A edrioasteroïd	
Chinianaster	C. levyi			A goniactinid stelleroïd	
Villebrunaster	V. thorali			A goniactinid stelleroïd	
Ampullaster	A. ubaghsi			A goniactinid stelleroïd	
Pradesura	P. jacobi			A stenurid stelleroïd	

Other fossil remains of marine animals are known from the formation:

- brachiopods;
- molluscs :
  - bivalves,
  - rostroconchs,
  - monoplacophorans;
- gastropods;
- graptolites.
