= Calcichordate hypothesis =

The calcichordate hypothesis, formulated by British Museum paleontologist Richard Jefferies, holds that each separate lineage of chordate (Cephalochordates, Urochordates, Craniates) evolved from its own lineage of mitrate, and thus the echinoderms and the chordates are sister groups, with the hemichordates as an out-group. It has been disproven by the discovery that the "tail" of Stylophorans contains a water vascular system, ambulacrum, and tube feet. However, the clade Olfactores was first proposed as part of the calcichordate theory, and has since been validated through genetic sequencing, albeit without the involvement of mitrates.

== Details ==
The carpoids Cornuta and Mitrata are grouped together in a clade called Calcichordata. Cornutes and mitrates are viewed as sister groups, and mitrates represent stem group chordates. The mitrates (and thus the chordates) are all Dexiothetes, dexiothetism being a synapomorphy for the clade.

=== Hypothetical phylogeny ===
In the evolution of the chordates, the ancestors of the chordates underwent a profound remodeling of their bauplan, becoming dexiothetetic. All chordates share a common ancestor which lost its echinoderm stereom calcite skeleton. However, later revisions of the theory had each separate lineage losing its calcitic skeleton independently, as it evolved from its own mitrate ancestor, making the chordates a paraphyletic group.

- Deuterostomata
  - Hemichordatata
    - Pterobranchia
    - Graptolithina
    - Enteropneusta
  - Echinodermata
    - Echinoderms
      (crown group)
    - Homalozoa
      - Homostelea
        Cinctans
      - Homoiostelea
        Solutes
      - Stylophora (Calcichordata)
        - Dexiothetes
          - Mitrates
          - - Urochordata
            - Chordata
            - Cephalochordata
        - Cornutes

The calcichordate family tree in its original incarnation, with all chordates originating from a soft bodied ancestor. Later versions of the theory had each chordate group having a mitrate ancestor each, requiring three episodes of loss of stereom. Mitrates are assumed to have evolved from the cornutes.

The central part of the Calcichordate Theory lies in the interpretation of the phylogeny of the two groups of stylophorans, which are termed calcichordates in the theory. Mitrates (and the rest of the calcichordates that evolved from them) are dexiothetic as a synapomorphy, having evolved from a cornute. Mitrates are thought to have formed their tail from the proximal part of the cornute tail, with the distal part atomised, and evolving new appendages. The left hand side in this scheme would be cognate with the Pterobranch left-hand side, with the right hand side a novel feature. This would explain the bizarre embryology of Amphioxus, a basal cephalochordate widely held to be the prime example of a chordate bauplan.

=== Anatomy according to the Calcichordate view ===
The appendage of the carpoids is regarded as a tail, with the central canal probably containing a notochord. The large orifice seen is most likely the mouth, with many of the slits along the side assumed to be gill slits. While the Cornuta were interpreted as lying with the flat side ventrally, Jefferies suggested that in Mitrata the flat side was dorsal and the convex side ventral, while the tail was curved underneath to provide forward thrust; many mitrates are preserved with the tail underneath.

== Criticism ==
The calcichordate theory is not widely accepted as a viable theory on the origins of the chordates. Many cite its overall unparsimonious nature as unnecessary, however there are many specific points that can be raised. All in all, the carpoids are much closer to echinoderms than to chordates.

=== Loss of Stereom ===
Stereom calcite is considered to be a synapomorphy of the echinoderms, and there is no evidence for it ever having evolved in any other lineage, and there is no crown group echinoderm that seems to have lost it secondarily. The theory implies either that it must have been lost once or three times, which is considered to be very unlikely.

=== Timing of appearance ===
Chordates are known to exist from the Cambrian with Pikaia, which is around the same time that carpoids are found, although the mitrates may not be stem group.

=== Genetic evidence ===
Genetic evidence has shown that Hemichordata is the sister group to Echinodermata.

== Falsification ==
The calcichordate hypothesis has been disproven as of 2019; exceptional preservation of soft tissues in the single appendage of the stylophorans Thoralicystis and Hanusia revealed clear traces consistent with a water vascular system—an ambulacral canal with tube feet—covered by movable plates, where the calcichordate hypothesis would require the anatomy be a tail containing a notochord protected by fixed plates. The enlarged area at the base of the appendage, which in the calcichordate hypothesis would contain muscles to move the tail, contains an extension of the body cavity.

The findings also disprove the hypothesis that the group were stalked echinoderms. Based on the internal anatomy, "calcichordates" (stylophorans) are revealed as echinoderms with a single, somewhat starfish-like arm that gathered food with tube feet and transferred it to a mouth at the base of the arm. The food-gathering arm may also have been used for locomotion, as in starfish. The fossils from the Bou Izargane Lagerstätte from the Lower Ordivician of Morocco were unknown to Jeffries; they had not been discovered when he formulated the hypothesis in the early 1960s based on the examination of a group of mitrate fossils, and were still unknown when he wrote subsequent papers in 1981 and 1997 defending the hypothesis. Stylophorans are classed as echinoderms based on their possession of at least two shared and unique features (apomorphies) of the phylum; stereom plates and a water vascular system. Because they show no sign of radial symmetry, the position of stylophorans within Echinodermata remains unresolved as of 2019.

== See also ==
- Carpoids
- Cornuta (Cornutes)
- Mitrates
- Stylophorans
- Echinoderms
- Olfactores
