= Saint-Chinian AOC =

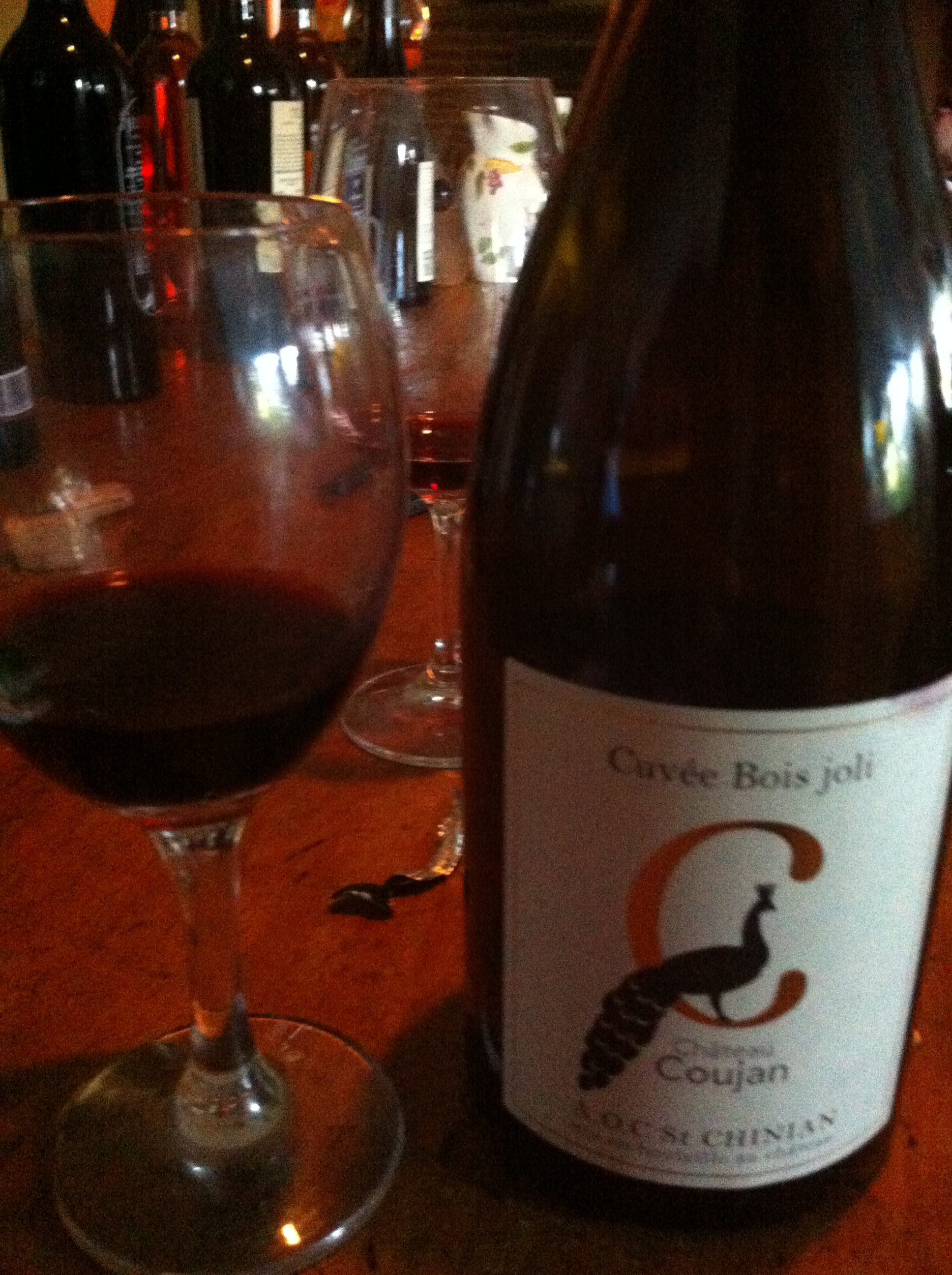
Glass and bottle of a red wine from the Saint-Chinian AOC (this one darker for being made mostly from Carignan grape).

The Saint-Chinian (French pronunciation: [sɛ̃ ʃinjɑ̃]) is a French wine, from the Languedoc-Roussillon wine region of France. It is usually a blend of several grape varieties, and produced in red, rosé, and white versions. Since 1982, the name is protected by an appellation d'origine contrôlée (AOC, "controlled designation of origin"). Its terroir was named after the nearby village of Saint-Chinian.

== History ==
=== Prehistoric and antiquity ===
It is considered to be the oldest winemaking area in the old Languedoc region of France (now known as the Languedoc-Roussillon and the Midi-Pyrénées in the south of France), vineyards having been cultivated since ancient times. The vineyards were developed during the Roman presence in France, notably at the time of the development of the Via Domitia, the first Roman road to link Gaul and Hispania. The wines produced at the time were exported across the Mediterranean Sea in ceramic vases known as amphora, and were very much appreciated in Rome. They are mentioned by Cicero and Pliny the Younger.

=== Middle Ages ===
During the Middle Ages, the monks preserved a part of the vineyard, wine, at the time, being produced by abbeys and monasteries. Towards the 18th century, the Benedictine monks developed the vines in the Vernazobres valley, a tributary of the Orb river near Saint-Chinian.

=== Modern times ===
The Languedoc vineyards had a renewed burst of development as a result of the opening of the Canal du Midi at the end of the 17th century, the canal allowing the wine to be exported towards the north of France and the rest of Europe. In the region of Saint-Chinian, the decline of smaller industries has worked in favour of the wine-making industry. The profits and workforce have been transferred to this industry.

Viticulture in the Languedoc reached its peak in the 19th century. Thanks to the development of rail transport and the building of railroads, the wine of Hérault can be efficiently dispatched towards the north of France and Europe. Wine production often takes place in spectacular châteaus, known as "folies". Béziers claims to be the "wine capital of the world".

=== Contemporary times ===
After the Second World War, and especially since the 1970s, the Languedoc region has regularly suffered from the problem of overproduction. It therefore has had to try to change its wine-making policy and promote quality over quantity, using better-quality grape varieties taken from other French regions.

In 1951 Saint-Chinian was classified as a Vin Délimité de Qualité Supérieure (VDQS), the second highest category of French wine.

In 1982 the area was awarded an Appellation d'origine contrôlée, AOC Saint-Chinian. The application for the appellation was supported by Raoul Bayou, parliamentarian from Hérault and past mayor of Cessenon.

At the turn of the millennium, the Languedoc region went through a serious wine-making crisis: overproduction, bad sales and competition with wines from the New World and the Southern hemisphere on the international market. A number of co-operative wine-makers have found themselves in great financial difficulty and have received help from the French State or the European Union. There has been a number of demonstrations in the region, some violent, often supported by elected officials of wine-making communes. Some wine-growers have found themselves obliged to uproot their vineyards.

In 2004, the Institut National des Appellations d'Origine recognised the existence of two geographic sub-appellations: Saint-Chinian-Berlou and Saint-Chinian-Roquebrun. 2004 also saw the introduction of the Saint-Chinian Blanc appellation.

== Location ==
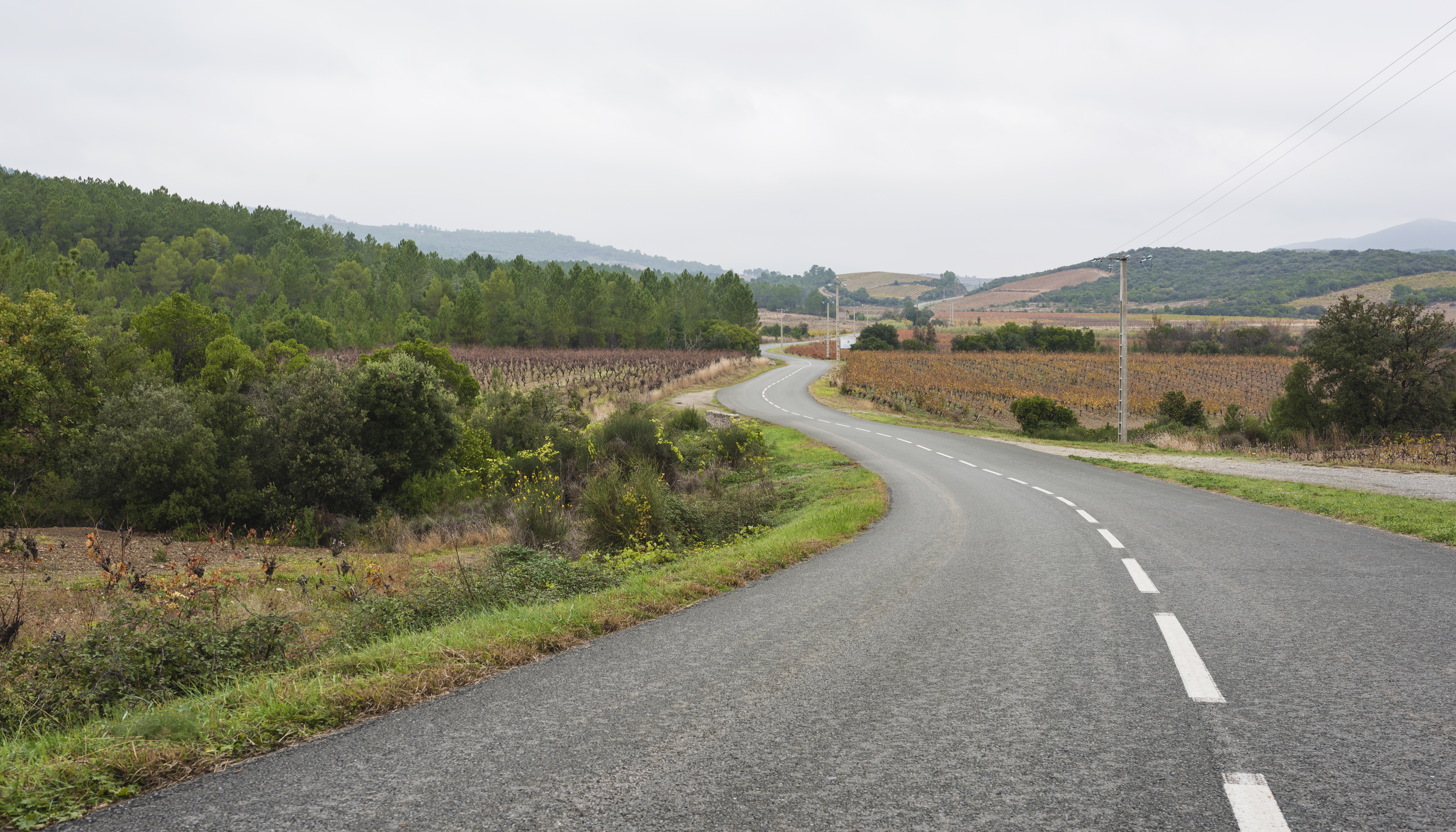
A road surrounded by the vineyards of the Saint-Chinian AOC

The Saint-Chinian AOC is situated in the foothills of the Massif Central, the plateau of Espinouse, in the west of the department of Hérault, between Béziers and Saint-Pons de Thomières. It is exposed to the Mediterranean Sea. To the North, it is bordered by scrubland, to the South, lies the wine-producing plain of Béziers. It is crossed by the Orb, and its two tributaries, which provide the water for the Saint-Chinian vines, and the Lirou, which provides the water for the Puisserguier vines.

=== Geology ===
The ground of the AOC Saint-Chinian consists of two distinct parts. To the north of the appellation, the soil is composed of the same schists as the Faugères area. The wines produced on these schists are deep in colour, very expressive in the mouth, fruity and a little acidic. These wines have flavours reminiscent of the maquis (Mediterranean shrubland). To the south of the appellation, beyond the village of Saint-Chinian, the soils are quite clayey and chalky. The ground is even chalkier towards the villages of Assignan and Villespassans; whereas the marl clay-chalky soils dominate in the villages of Cazedarnes, Puisserguier, Creissan and Quarante. This type of soil produces wines that are light, with hints of red fruit and of the garrigue. The wines grown on chalk mature particularly well.

== Vineyards ==
The vineyards are situated in the department of Hérault, about twenty kilometres west of Béziers.

=== Introduction ===
The vineyards stretches over the communes of: Assignan, Babeau-Bouldoux Berlou, Causses-et-Veyran, Cazedarnes, Cébazan, Cessenon-sur-Orb, Creissan, Cruzy, Ferrières-Poussarou, Murviel-lès-Béziers, Pierrerue, Prades-sur-Vernazobre, Puisserguier, Quarante, Roquebrun, Saint-Chinian, Saint-Nazaire-de-Ladarez, Vieussan and Villespassans.

=== Grape varieties ===
The grapes used at Saint-Chinian are Carignan, Cinsault, Grenache, Lledoner Pelut, Mourvèdre and Syrah. Syrah (used to ameliorate the wines), Mourvèdre and Grenache represent approximately 70% of the grapes grown on the land. The Carignan grape is used in the making of red wines, while the Cinsault grape is better for the making of fruity rosé wines. Some wine-growers offer 100% Carignan vines, but as Vin de Table, since these products, which are not blends as required by the AOC regulations, cannot be sold under the Saint-Chinian AOC designation.

=== Cultivation methods ===
Particularly to the south of the region, the vines are 'trained' by being attached to wires, whereas in the North, they use the "goblet" vine training system on sloping vineyards.

== Marketing ==
With regards to the volume of wine produced, the Saint-Chinian AOC is the fourth in Languedoc, behind Corbières, Coteaux du Languedoc and Minervois.

== See also ==
- List of Vins de Primeur
