= Cardiocystella =

Cardiocystella Temporal range: Upper Cambrian

Scientific classification
- Domain: Eukaryota
- Kingdom: Animalia
- Phylum: Echinodermata
- Class: †Stylophora
- Order: †Cornuta
- Family: †Cothurnocystidae
- Genus: †Cardiocystella; Sumrall et al., 2009

Extinct genus of echinoderms

Cardiocystella is an upper Cambrian genus of cornute echinoderm.
