= Dexiothetism =

Reorganisation of a clade's bauplan

Dexiothetism refers to a reorganisation of a clade's bauplan, with right becoming ventral and left becoming dorsal. The organism would then recruit a new left hand side.

== Details ==
If a bilaterally symmetrical ancestor were to become affixed by its right hand side, it would occlude all features on that side. When evolutionary pressures again favored bilateral symmetry, the new left and right hand sides would be derived from the features remaining from the original left hand side. The end result is a bilaterally symmetrical animal, but with its dorsoventral axis rotated a quarter of a turn.

== Implications ==
Dexiothetism has been implicated in the origin of the unusual embryology of the cephalochordate amphioxus, whereby its gill slits originate on the left hand side and the migrate to the right hand side.

In Jefferies' calcichordate hypothesis, he supposes that all chordates and their mitrate ancestors are dexiothetic.

More recently, dexiothetism has been cited outside of the calcichordate theory in a proposed evolutionary history of echinoderms.
