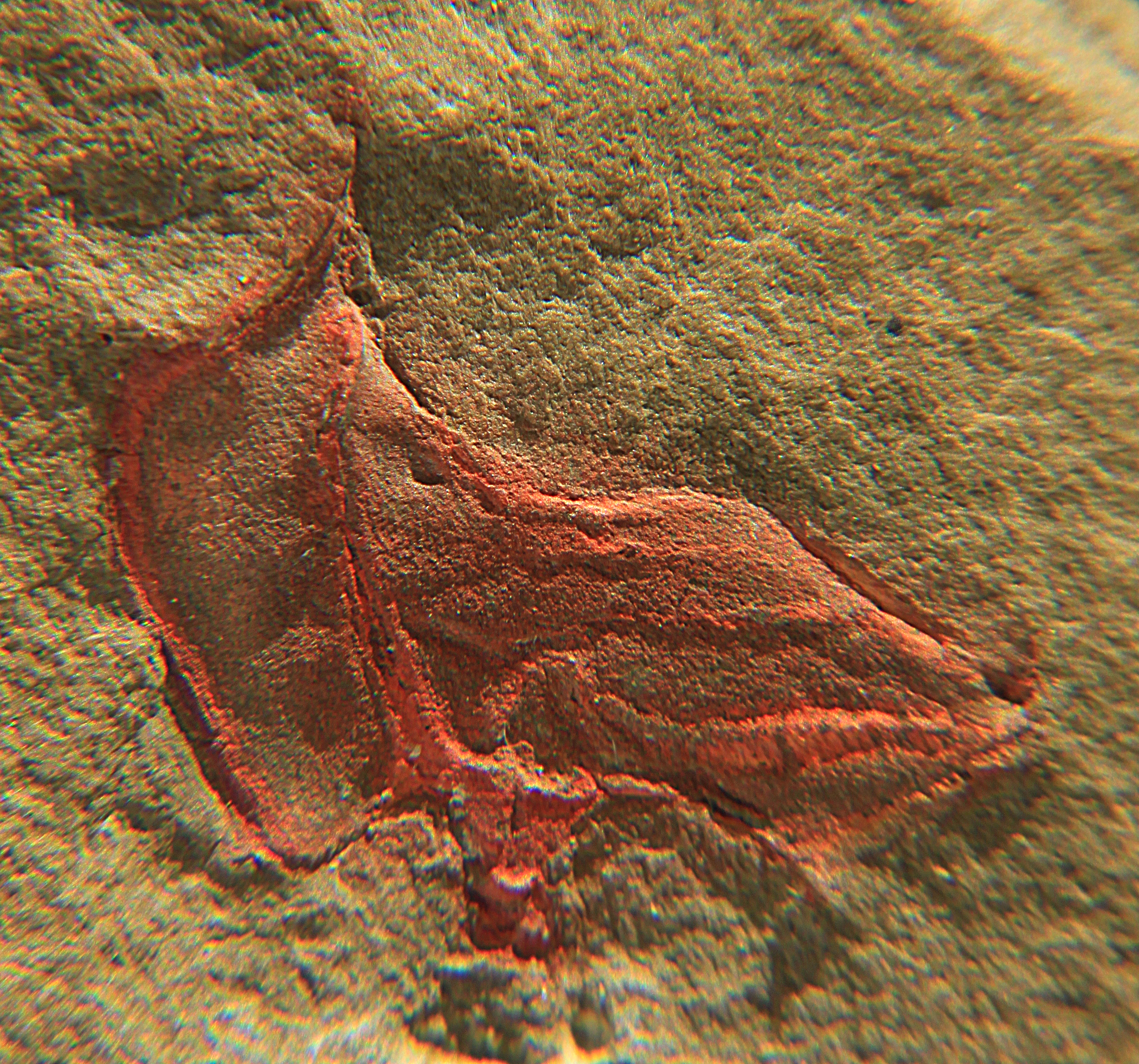
- Cothurnocystis elizae

Scientific classification
- Domain: Eukaryota
- Kingdom: Animalia
- Phylum: Echinodermata
- Class: †Stylophora
- Order: †Cornuta
- Suborder: †Cothurnocystida
- Family: †Cothurnocystidae; Bather, 1913

Subfamilies
- See text

= Cothurnocystidae =

Extinct family of marine invertebrates

Cothurnocystidae is an extinct family of stylophoran echinoderms in the order Cornuta.

It contains four subfamilies and six genera not assigned to subfamilies:

- Chauvelicystinae
  - Ampelocarpus
  - Chauvelicystis
  - Flabellicarpus
  - Lyricocarpus
  - Milonicystis
  - Prochauvelicystis
  - Proscotiaecystis
  - Sokkaejaecystis
- Cothurnocystinae
  - Cothurnocystis
- Phyllocystinae
- Scotiaecystinae
  - Bohemiaecystis
  - Scotiaecystis
  - Thoralicystis
- Unassigned
  - Acuticarpus
  - Archaeocothurnus
  - Cardiocystella
  - Nevadaecystis
  - Ponticulocarpus
  - Trigonocarpus
