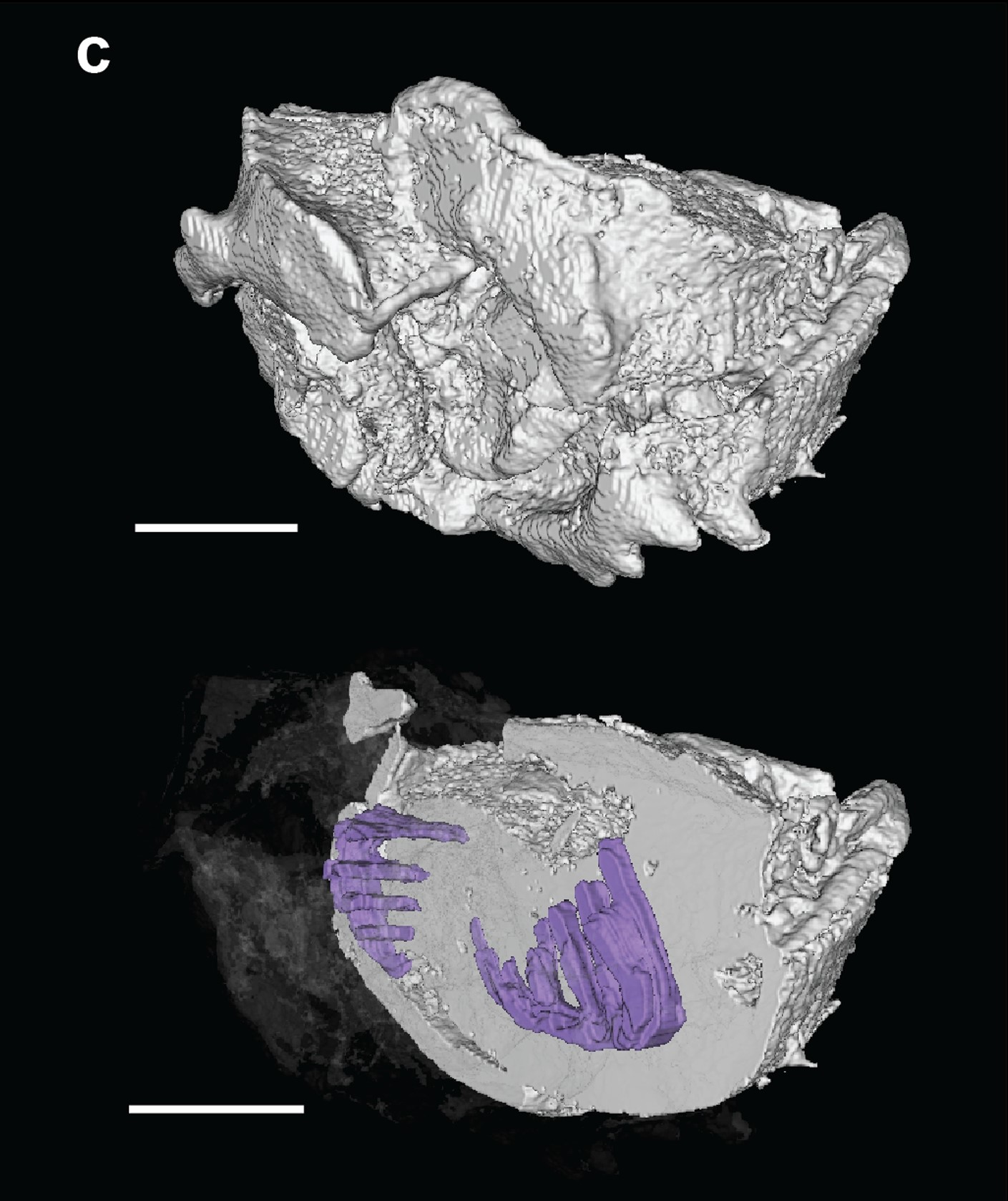
- Three-dimensional reconstruction of a specimen of Jaekelocarpus oklahomensis (UWBM74305) with internal bars (violet)

Scientific classification
- Kingdom: Animalia
- Phylum: Echinodermata
- Class: †Stylophora
- Order: †Mitrata
- Family: †Jaekelocarpidae; Kolata et al., 1991
- Genus: †Jaekelocarpus; Kolata et al., 1991
- Species: †J. oklahomensis

Binomial name
- †Jaekelocarpus oklahomensis Kolata et al., 1991

= Jaekelocarpus =

Jaekelocarpus Temporal range: Carboniferous, Early Pennsylvanian (Morrowan)

Extinct genus of echinoderms

Jaekelocarpus is a genus of mitrate stylophoran known from the Morrowan age of the Golf Course Formation, southern Oklahoma, US. It possessed two billaterally symmetrical complexes of four internal bars. The morphological similarity of these structures to the gill bars of cephalochordates and enteropneusts is considered a likely indicator of their homology.
