= Diargyria argyrodeixis =

Scientific classification
- Domain: Eukaryota
- Kingdom: Animalia
- Phylum: Arthropoda
- Class: Insecta
- Order: Lepidoptera
- Superfamily: Noctuoidea
- Family: Noctuidae
- Genus: Diargyria
- Species: D. argyrodeixis

Binomial name
- Diargyria argyrodeixis M. Krüger, 2009

Species of butterfly

Diargyria argyrodeixis is a species of butterfly belonging to the family Noctuidae. It is endemic to the Western Cape in South Africa.

== Etymology ==
The name argyrodeixis is derived from Greek, meaning silver (arguros), and deixis (display), referring to the forewing pattern.

== Description ==
The species is known by its type locality, in fynbos in Citrusdal in the Western Cape.

The wingspan is 13–15 mm (0.51–0.59 in) for males and 13–14 mm (0.51–0.55 in) for females. Adults are on wing from late April to early June.

D. argyrodeixis resembles D. argyhorion but differs by the coloration and pattern of its wings, and its genitalia. The median area of the forewings is less evenly dark with the presence of checkered cilia. The wings are glossy, with silvery-white forewings unevenly suffused with dark greyish brown towards median. The hindwings have a light greyish suffusion, bolder in females.

Males differ from other species in the genus by having a more bifid apex of valvae, and a large nail-like cornutus on its vesica. There is a presence of more developed genital structures like a curved and pointed uncus, bifurcation of the valvae's costa, and a smaller aedaegus. Females feature a tube-like bursa copulatrix, lacking an appendix bursae.

Both sexes have short, bipectinate antennae, with shorter rami in females.
