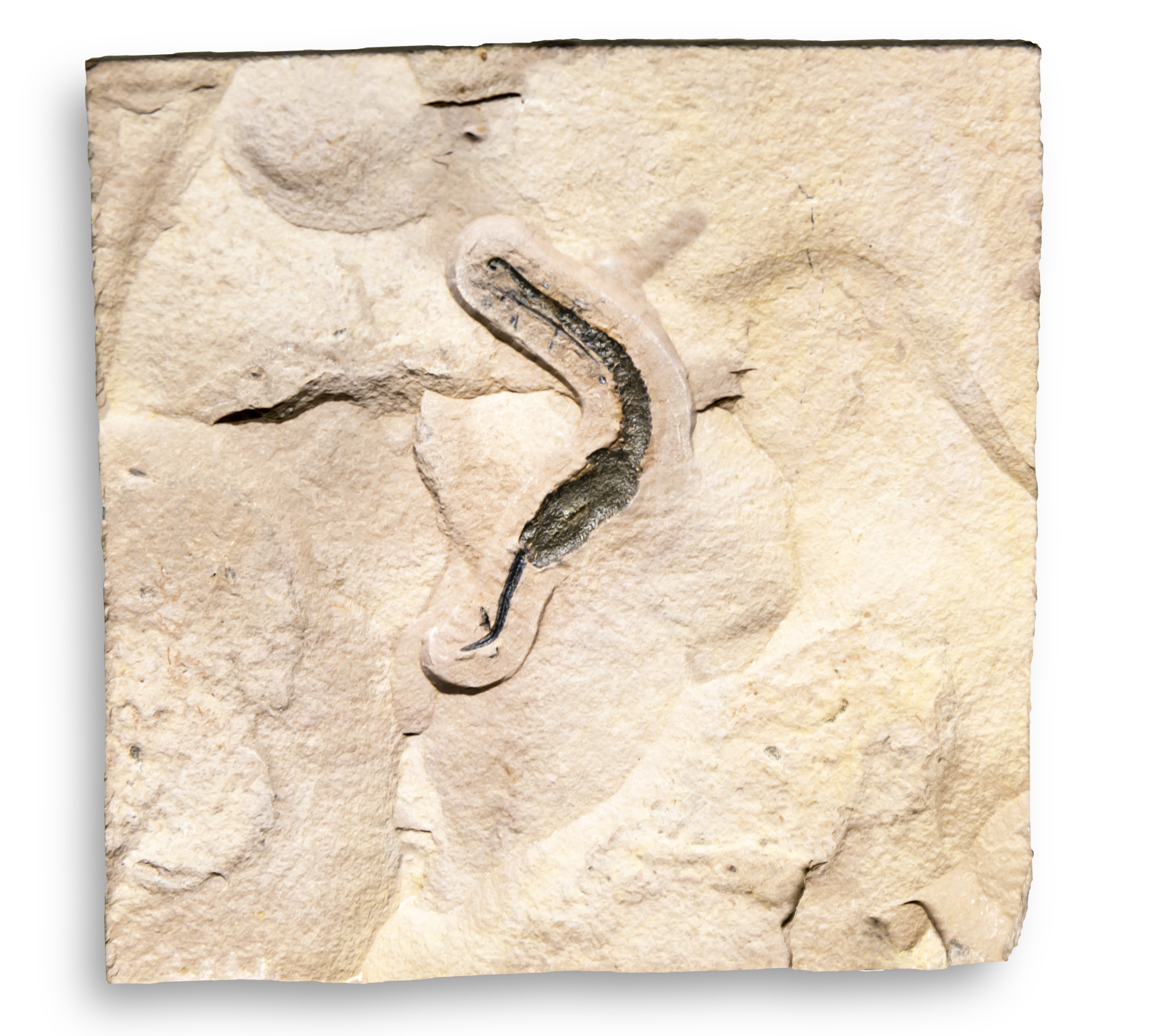
- Fossil specimen of Coleicarpus sprinklei
- Silhouette of Castericystis

Scientific classification
- Kingdom: Animalia
- Clade: Ambulacraria
- Phylum: Echinodermata
- Subphylum: †Blastozoa (?)
- Class: †Soluta; Jaekel, 1901

Orders
- †Syringocrinida; †Dendrocystitida

= Soluta (echinoderm) =

Soluta Temporal range: Drumian – Lower Devonian

Extinct clade of echinoderms

Soluta is an extinct class of echinoderms that lived from the Middle Cambrian to the Early Devonian. The class is also known by its junior synonym Homoiostelea. Soluta is one of the four "carpoid" classes, alongside Ctenocystoidea, Cincta, and Stylophora, which made up the obsolete subphylum Homalozoa. Solutes (or solutans) were asymmetric animals with a stereom skeleton and two appendages, an arm extending anteriorly and a posterior appendage called a homoiostele.

== Biology ==
Most solutes were free-living, but the basal solutan Coleicarpus used its homoiostele as a holdfast, as did juvenile Castericystis.

== Classification ==
- Coleicarpus
- - Castericystis
  - Minervaecystis
  - - Girvanicystis
    - Dendrocystites
    - - Maennilia
      - Heckericystis
    - - Dendrocystoides
      - - Claritacarpus
        - - Rutroclypeus
          - - - Iowacystis
              - Scalenocystites
            - - Syringocrinus
              - - Myeinocystites
                - Belemnocystites

Phylogenetic relationships within Soluta

The phylogenetic position of Soluta is contentious. Solutans are widely agreed to be echinoderms, though the outmoded calcichordate hypothesis held that they were ancestral to both echinoderms and chordates. Within echinoderms, one hypothesis holds that solutes are stem-group echinoderms which branched off before echinoderms evolved radial symmetry. Another hypothesis holds that they are specialized descendants of radiate echinoderms which lost radial symmetry, likely belonging to Blastozoa.

Solutes are divided into two orders, Syringocrinida and Dendrocystitida.

== Distribution ==
The earliest solutes, Coleicarpus and Castericystis, lived during the Drumian age of the Cambrian. Solutes were the last of the four carpoid classes to appear in the fossil record. Solutes appear to have evolved in Laurentia, but became more widespread during the Ordovician.
