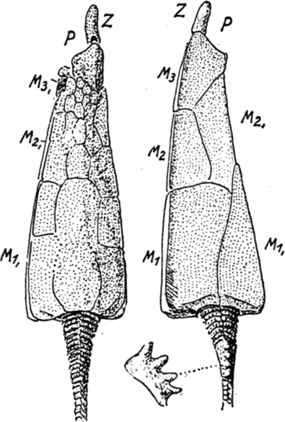
- Lagynocystis pyramidalis convex (left) and flat (right) surfaces

Scientific classification
- Kingdom: Animalia
- Phylum: Echinodermata
- Class: †Stylophora
- Order: †Mitrata
- Family: †Lagynocystidae; Jaekel, 1918
- Genus: †Lagynocystis; Jaekel, 1918
- Species: †L. pyramidalis

Binomial name
- †Lagynocystis pyramidalis (Barrande, 1887) Jaekel, 1918

Synonyms
- †Anomalocystites pyramidalis Barrande, 1887

= Lagynocystis =

Lagynocystis Temporal range: Cambrian, Furongian–Late Ordovician (upper Sandbian)

Extinct genus of echinoderms

Lagynocystis is a genus of mitrate stylophoran known from the Furongian epoch of the Cambrian to the upper Sandbian age of the Ordovician, with specimens described from China, Czech Republic, France, the Iberian Peninsula, Morocco, Russia, and Wales. It contains a single species, Lagynocystis pyramidalis, and is the only member of the family Lagynocystidae. The genus bore internal bars morphologically similar to those found in modern cephalocordates and enteropneus, possibly suggesting their homology.

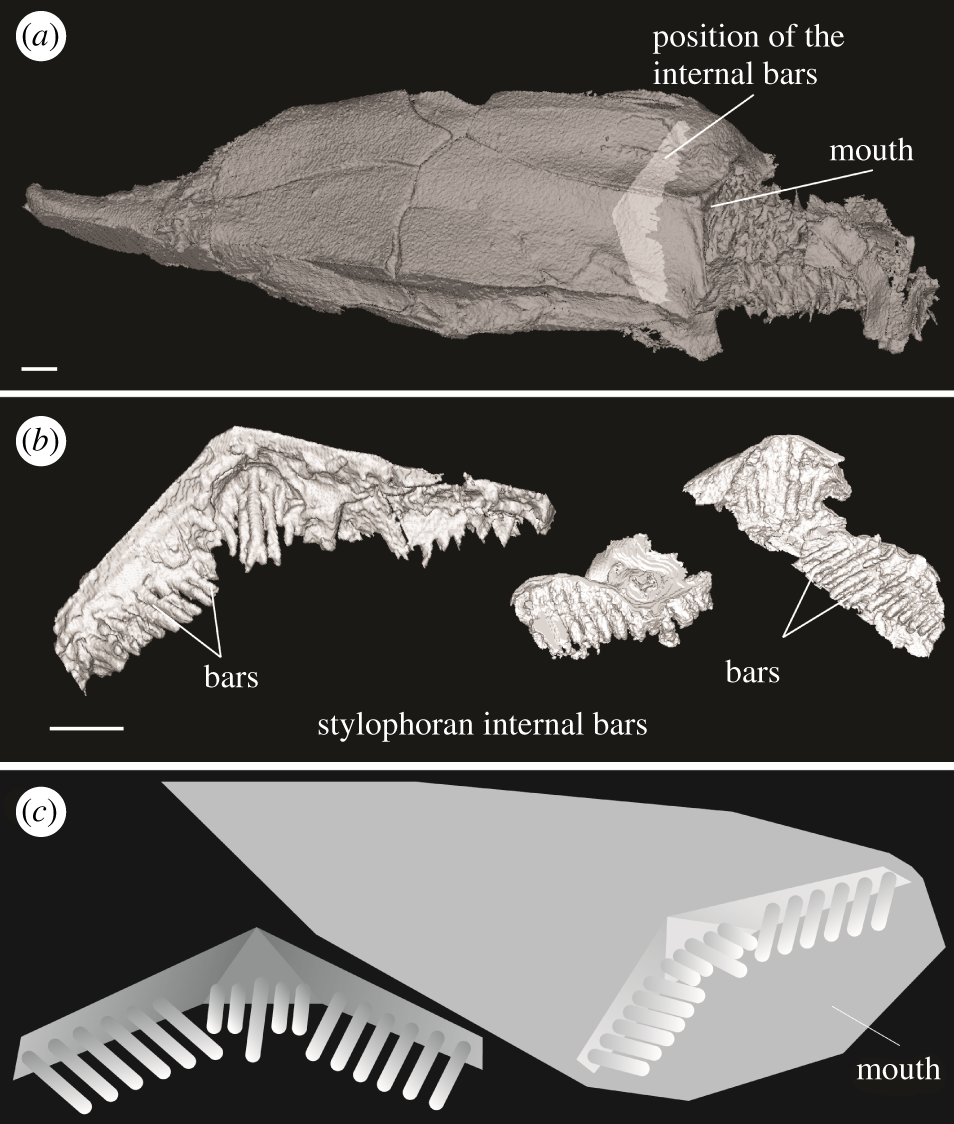
Micro-CT scans of Lagynocystis pyramidalis and its internal bars in three specimens (a-b), and a generalized diagram of the arrangement and morphology of the internal bars (c)
