= Amygdalotheca =

Amygdalotheca Temporal range: Early Ordovician (Lower Arenig), 477.1–471.3 Ma

Scientific classification
- Domain: Eukaryota
- Kingdom: Animalia
- Phylum: Echinodermata
- Class: †Stylophora
- Order: †Cornuta
- Family: †Amygdalothecidae
- Genus: †Amygdalotheca; Ubaghs, 1969
- Species: †A. griffei

Binomial name
- †Amygdalotheca griffei Ubaghs, 1969

Extinct genus of echinoderms

Amygdalotheca is an extinct genus of cornute stylophoran known from the Lower Arenig of the Saint-Chinian Formation, southern France.
