= Dick Jefferies =

English paleontologist (died 2020)

Richard Peter Spencer Jefferies (1932–2010) was a paleontologist famous for developing the Calcichordate Theory of the origin of chordates, now widely discredited. Jefferies joined the British Museum in 1960, and was largely based there for the remainder of his career.

He died in June 2020 at the age of 88.

== Developing the Calcichordate hypothesis ==
Jefferies first came into contact with some carpoid material in February 1964; some mitrates that had been brought into the museum from Shropshire, and by 1967 he published a paper entitled "Some chordates with Echinoderm affinities" with regards the mitrates, which are commonly viewed as apentameral echinoderms. Over the years, he continuously added to the theory, which was modified later such that each chordate evolved from its own mitrate and as such are paraphyletic.
