= Barrandeocarpus =

Barrandeocarpus Temporal range: Ordovician

Scientific classification
- Domain: Eukaryota
- Kingdom: Animalia
- Phylum: Echinodermata
- Class: †Stylophora
- Order: †Mitrata
- Family: †Placocystitinae
- Genus: †Barrandeocarpus; Ubaghs, 1979

Extinct genus of mitrates

Barrandeocarpus is a genus of Ordovician mitrate thought to resemble the ancestral untorted morphology of the group.
