= Bokkeveldia =

Bokkeveldia Temporal range: Early Devonian (Emsian)

Scientific classification
- Kingdom: Animalia
- Phylum: Echinodermata
- Class: †Stylophora
- Order: †Mitrata
- Suborder: †Anomalocystitida
- Genus: †Bokkeveldia; Ruta & Theron, 1997
- Species: †B. oosthuizeni

Binomial name
- †Bokkeveldia oosthuizeni Ruta & Theron, 1997

Extinct genus of mitrate echinoderms

Bokkeveldia is a genus of mitrate stylophoran known from fossil material found in Gydo Shale, Bokkeveld Group, South Africa, dating to the Emsian stage. The genus contains a single species, Bokkeveldia oosthuizeni.

== Description ==
This species is known from a complete external mold, slightly disrupted posteriorly, of the convex surface. This surface is characterized by 22 plate elements arranged through five transverse rows, with row I, III and IV bearing each five plates, row II bearing four plates and row V bearing three.

In a phylogenetic analysis by Ruta in 1999, the arrangement of these plates is used as a reference to establish the homology and consistent numeclature of the plates of the convex surface in anomalocystitids, which display high variation in the number, shape, size and relative position of these.

== Classification ==
In the analysis by Ruta in 1999, focused on anomalocystitids, and the supertrees for stylophoran echinoderms by Ruta in 2003 and Lefebvre in 2005, Bokkeveldia is recovered inside a well-defined clade of "austral" anomalocystitids, containing taxa such as Mongolocarpos, Placocystites, Rhenoystis, and Victoriacystis.
