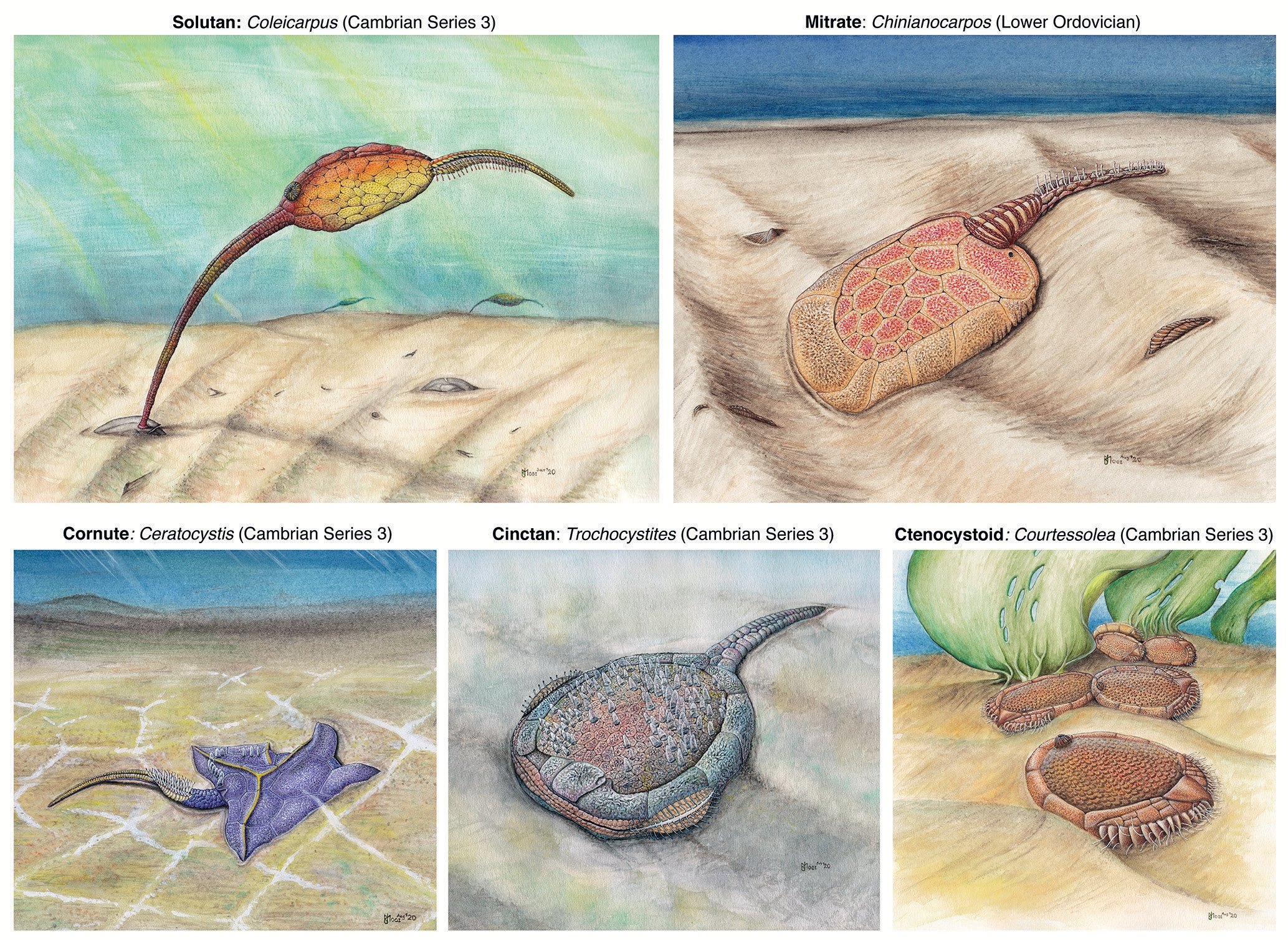
- Reconstructions of various homalozoans in life position. From the left to the right of each row and from top to bottom: Coleicarpus (a solute), Chinianocarpus (a mitrate), Ceratocystis (a basal stylophoran), Trochocystites (a cinctan), and Courtessolea (a ctenocystoid)

Scientific classification
- Kingdom: Animalia
- Phylum: Echinodermata
- Subphylum: †Homalozoa; Whitehouse, 1941

Groups included
- Stylophora (mitrates and cornutes); Soluta; Cincta; Ctenocystoidea (ctenoid-bearing homalozoans)

= Homalozoa =

Homalozoa Temporal range: Middle Cambrian–Carboniferous, Pennsylvanian

Extinct historic group of marine invertebrates

Homalozoa is an obsolete extinct subphylum of Paleozoic era echinoderms, prehistoric marine invertebrates. They are also referred to as carpoids.

== Description ==
The Homalozoa lacked the typical pentamer body form of other echinoderms, but all were sessile animals. Instead all Homalozoans were markedly asymmetric, and were extremely variable in forms.

The body (theca) was covered with calcite plates with a number of openings. Their form is in some cases so unusual that it is unclear which openings are to be considered as mouth and anus. Many of them were stalked, similar to sea lilies (crinoids), but often their bodies were bent over, so that the mouth and anus projected forwards rather than upwards. Some forms, especially stylophorans, rested flat on the sea floor.

In some forms the single ray (brachiole or aulacophore) possessed an ambulacral groove.

It has been claimed that some forms possessed gills and gill slits.

The first homalozoans found in the fossil record are in lower Middle Cambrian rocks of northern Utah.

== Taxonomy ==
Homalozoans were traditionally considered to be stem-group echinoderms, but had also been considered to lie in the stem lineage of the chordates (calcichordates). However, it is now generally accepted that homalozoans were echinoderms because their calcite skeleton was composed of the typical stereom crystalline structure.

They include the unusual stylophorans (mitrates and cornutes), Homoiostelea (solutes), the Homostelea (cinctans), and the Ctenocystoidea (ctenoid-bearing homalozoans). They have recently been recognised as a polyphyletic group. The stylophorans are now classified as a clade of the Crinozoa, whereas the other three are classified as clades of the Blastozoa.

=== Solutes ===
Unlike many other types of echinoderm, solute homalozoans lack radial symmetry (such as the five limbs of a starfish). Solutes are the sole order of the class Homoiostelea.

Solute fossils have an irregularly shaped flattened body covered in calcite plates, and are up to about 10 cm long. The body has two appendages, interpreted as a "feeding arm" at one end, bearing tube feet at its end, and a "stele" at the other, which may have been used by the animal to propel itself along the sea floor.

== See also ==
- Prehistoric echinoderms
  - Blastozoa
  - Cystoidea
- Paleozoic echinoderms
