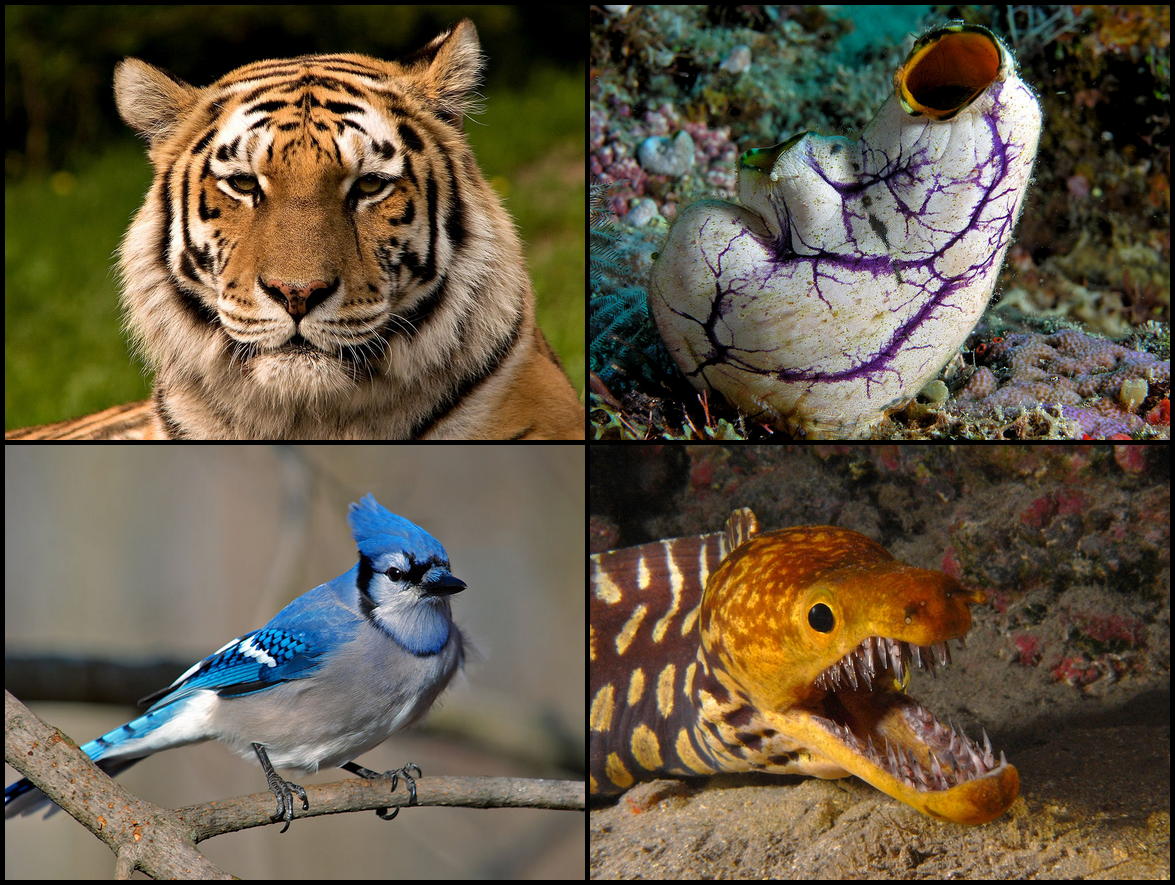
- Example of Olfactores

Scientific classification
- Kingdom: Animalia
- Phylum: Chordata
- Clade: Olfactores; Jefferies, 1991

Subphyla
- Tunicata; Vertebrata (=Craniata)

= Olfactores =

Olfactores Temporal range: Cambrian Stage 3–Present, 518–0 Ma (Possible Ediacaran record, 557 Ma)

Clade of animals comprising vertebrates and tunicates

Olfactores is a clade within the Chordata that comprises the Tunicata (Urochordata) and the Vertebrata (sometimes referred to as Craniata). Olfactores represent the overwhelming majority of the phylum Chordata, as the Cephalochordata (with only 32 known species across 3 genera) are the only chordates not included in the clade. This clade is defined by a more advanced olfactory system which, in the immediate vertebrate generation, gave rise to nostrils.

== Etymology ==
The name Olfactores comes from Latin *olfactores ("smellers," from purposive supine olfactum of olfacio, "to smell," with plural masculine agentive nominalizing suffix -tores), due to the development of pharyngeal respiratory and sensory functions, in contrast with cephalochordates such as the lancelet which lack a respiratory system and specialized sense organs.

== Olfactores hypothesis ==
The long-standing Euchordata hypothesis that Cephalochordata is a sister taxon to Craniata was once widely accepted, likely influenced by significant tunicate morphological apomorphies from other chordates, with cephalochordates even being nicknamed 'honorary vertebrates.'

The name Olfactores was originally introduced in 1991 as part of the now-disproven calcichordate hypothesis. However, studies since 2006 analyzing large sequencing datasets strongly support Olfactores as a clade.

=== Anatomy of ancestral Olfactores ===
Some studies suggest that the ancestors of Appendicularia and Vertebrata were possibly sedentary-pelagic, although others recover a free-living chordate ancestor transitioning to free-living vertebrates without an intervening sedentary form. A rudimentary neural crest is present in tunicates, implying its presence in the Olfactores ancestor also, as vertebrates have a true neural crest.
