= Diargyria =

Scientific classification
- Domain: Eukaryota
- Kingdom: Animalia
- Phylum: Arthropoda
- Class: Insecta
- Order: Lepidoptera
- Superfamily: Noctuoidea
- Family: Noctuidae
- Subfamily: Cuculliinae
- Genus: Diargyria; Krüger, 2005

Genus of butterflies

Diargyria is a genus of butterflies characterized by the presence of silver on their wings. It is found in South Africa.

== Etymology ==
The name Diargyria is derived from Greek, meaning 'two' or 'double' (di) and 'silver' (argyros). It refers to the silver coloration on the wings.

== Description ==
The genus Diargyria (Krüger, 2005) contains four species. These moths are found in different veld types in the Eastern and Western Cape. Some species are restricted to specific habitats like D. argyrogramma to Lesotho, and D. argyrostolmus to the Camdeboo mountains. However, D. argyrohorion has the widest distribution, and is found at altitudes over 1500m.

Type specimens of this genus are preserved in Transvaal Museum, Pretoria.

== Species ==
- Diargyria argyrodeixis Krüger, 2009
- Diargyria argyhorion Krüger, 2009
- Diargyria argyrogramma (Krüger, 2005)
- Diargyria argyrostolmus (Krüger, 2005)
