= Diargyria argyhorion =

Scientific classification
- Kingdom: Animalia
- Phylum: Arthropoda
- Class: Insecta
- Order: Lepidoptera
- Superfamily: Noctuoidea
- Family: Noctuidae
- Genus: Diargyria
- Species: D. argyhorion

Binomial name
- Diargyria argyhorion Krüger, 2009

Species of butterfly

Diargyria argyhorion is a species of butterfly belonging to the family Noctuidae. It is found in the Eastern and Western Cape, and KwaZulu-Natal Drakensberg in South Africa.

== Etymology ==
The name argyhorion is derived from Greek, meaning silver (arguros) and horion (border). It refers to the distinct basal and postmedian lines on the forewings.

== Description ==
The species is known by its type locality, fynbos in the Western cape and other veld types within the grassland biome further north.

The wingspan is 12-14 mm in males and 13-14 mm in females. Adults are on wing from late April to early June.

D. argyhorion resembles D. argyrodeixis but differs by the coloration and pattern of its wings, and its genitalia. The median area of the forewings is more evenly dark, and the cilia are less checkered. The wings are glossy, with silvery-white forewings suffused with greyish-brown towards its median. The hindwing is silvery-white with light greyish suffusion, which is more prominent in females.

Males feature a slightly curved and slender uncus, with a less pronounced bifid apex on the valvae. There is a nail-like cornutus, and a scobinate rod on the vesica. Its aedeagus is cylindrical in shape and larger. In females, the bursa copulatrix is broad and elliptical, with the presence of a well-sclerotized appendix bursae.

Both sexes have short, bipectinate antennae, with the female's rami being shorter.
