= Assignan =

- Commune
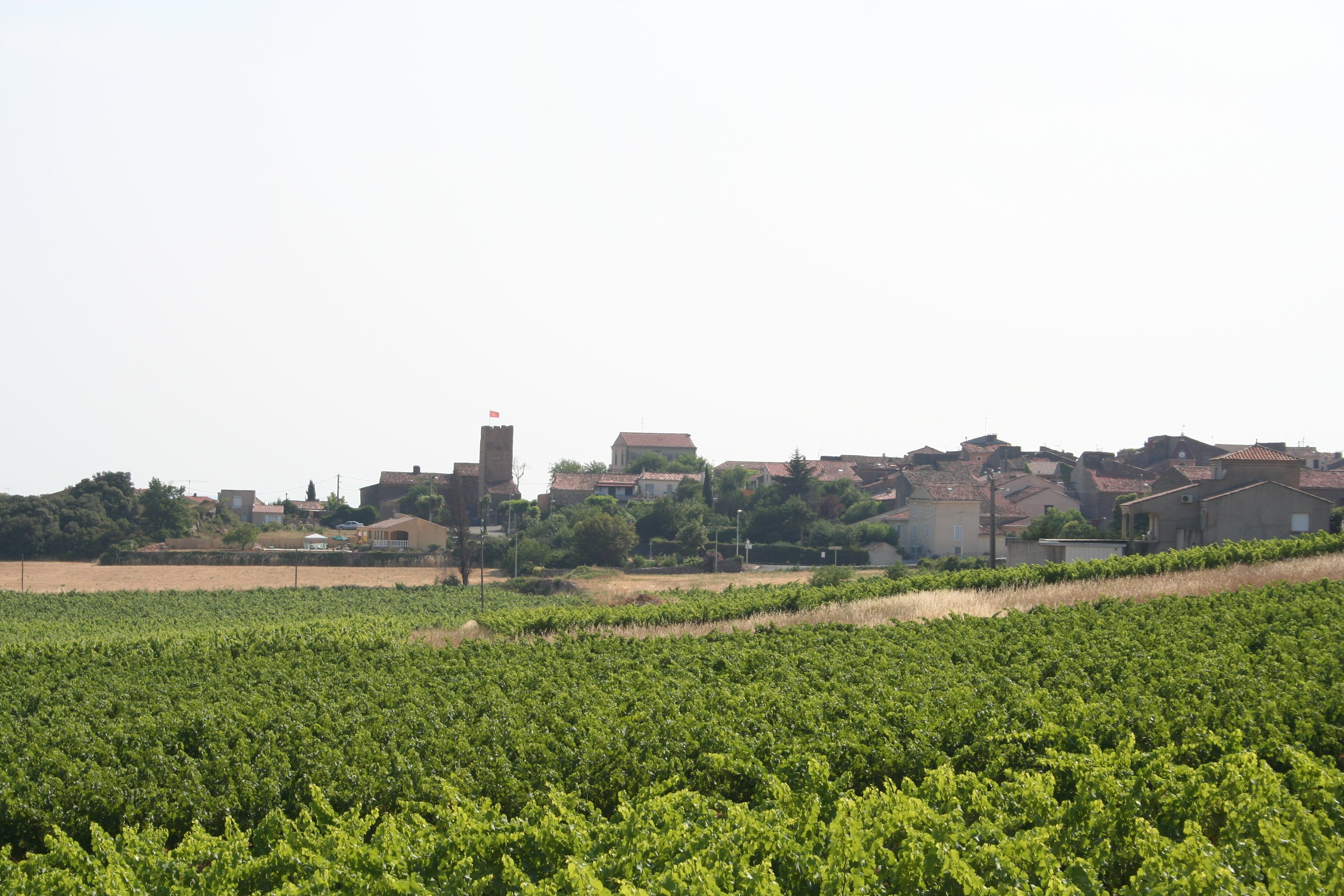
- Assignan

- Coat of arms
- Location of Assignan
- Location within France Location within Occitanie
- Coordinates: 43°23′55″N 2°53′22″E
- Country: France
- Region: Occitania
- Department: Hérault
- Arrondissement: Béziers
- Canton: Saint-Pons-de-Thomières
- Intercommunality: CC Sud-Hérault

Government
  - Mayor (2020–2026): Rémy Soulié
- Area^{1}: 7.95 km^{2} (3.07 sq mi)
- Elevation: 260 m (850 ft)
- Highest elevation: 408 m (1,339 ft)
- Lowest elevation: 173 m (568 ft)
- Population (2023): 174
  - Density: 21.9/km^{2} (56.7/sq mi)
- Time zone: UTC+01:00 (CET)
  - Summer (DST): UTC+02:00 (CEST)
- INSEE/Postal code: 34015 /34360
- ^{1} French Land Register data, which excludes lakes, ponds, glaciers > 1 km^{2} (0.386 sq mi or 247 acres) and river estuaries.

Assignan (French pronunciation: [asiɲɑ̃]; Occitan: Assinhan) is a commune in the Hérault department in southern France.

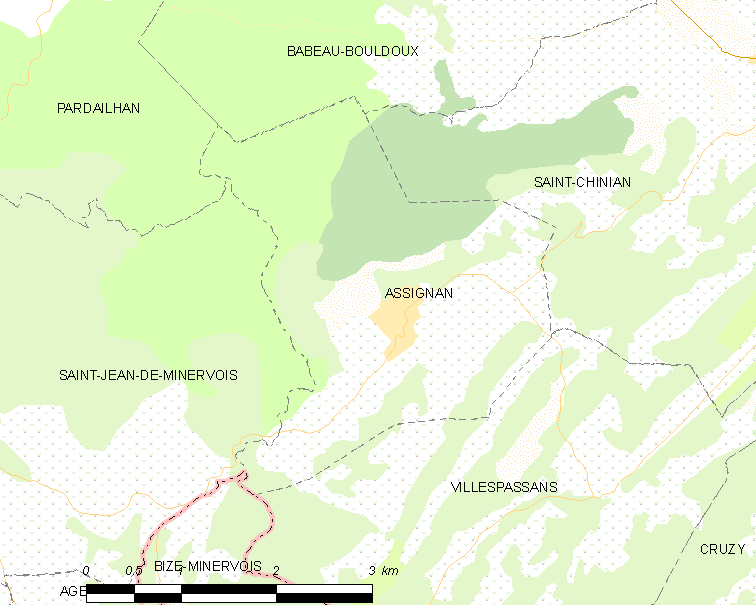
Map

== Population ==
Historical population
Year	Pop.	±% p.a.
1968	162	—
1975	118	−4.43%
1982	117	−0.12%
1990	145	+2.72%
1999	168	+1.65%
2007	183	+1.07%
2012	164	−2.17%
2017	162	−0.25%
2023	174	+1.20%
Source: INSEE

== See also ==
- Communes of the Hérault department
