= Acuticarpus =

Acuticarpus Temporal range: Late Cambrian, 497.0–486.85 Ma

Scientific classification
- Domain: Eukaryota
- Kingdom: Animalia
- Phylum: Echinodermata
- Class: †Stylophora
- Order: †Cornuta
- Suborder: †Cothurnocystida
- Genus: †Acuticarpus; Sumrall et al., 1997

Type species
- †Acuticarpus delticus Sumrall et al., 1997

Species
- †A. delticus Sumrall et al., 1997; †A. republicensis Sumrall et al., 1997

Extinct genus of echinoderms

Acuticarpus is an extinct genus of cornute stylophoran known from the Late Cambrian of the Snowy Range Formation, Wyoming, US.

== Etymology ==
The generic name derives from the combination of the Latin acutus, meaning "sharp edge", and the Greek carpos, meaning "sac", in reference to the sharp edge of its left thecal margin. The specific epithet of A. delticus references the triangular outline of the theca, while the one of A. republicensis references Republic Creek, Wyoming, the collection place of its holotype.
