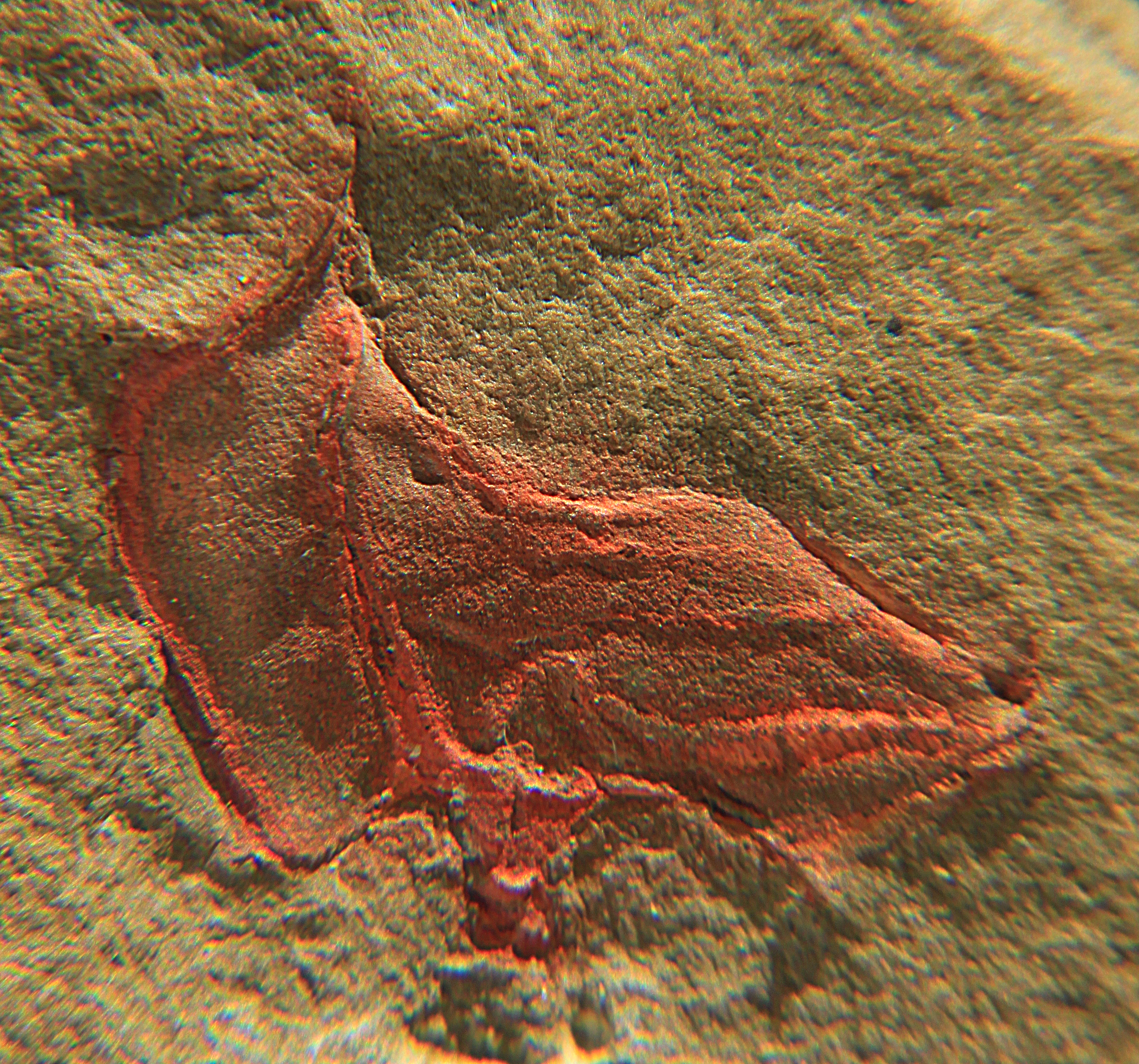
- Cothurnocystis elizae
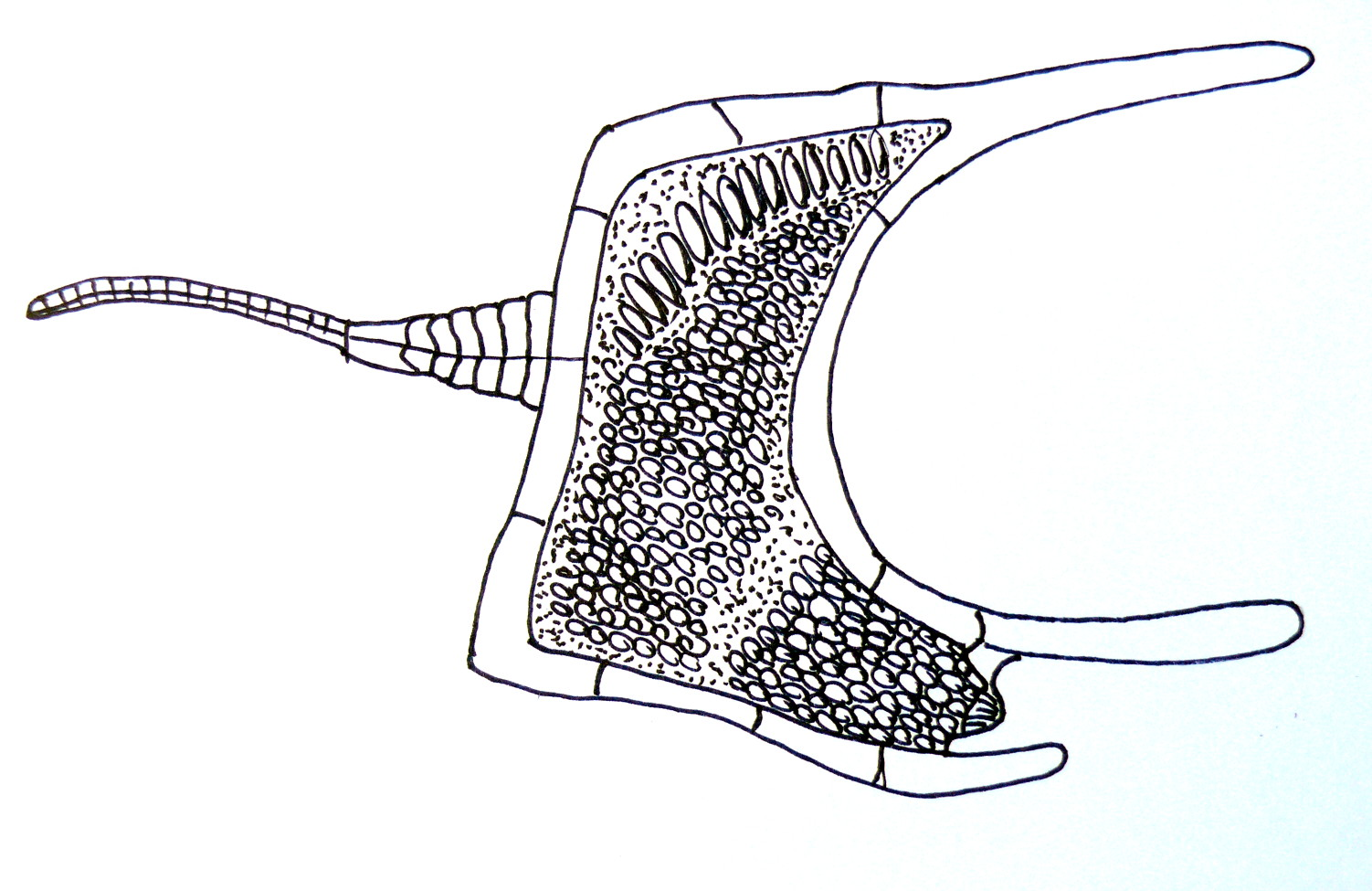

Scientific classification
- Kingdom: Animalia
- Phylum: Echinodermata
- Class: †Stylophora
- Order: †Cornuta
- Family: †Cothurnocystidae
- Subfamily: †Cothurnocystinae
- Genus: †Cothurnocystis; Bather, 1913

Species
- C. americana Ubachs, 1963; C. bifida; C. curvata; C. elizae Bather, 1913; C. fellinensis Ubachs, 1969

= Cothurnocystis =

Cothurnocystis Temporal range: Ordovician

Extinct genus of marine invertebrates

Cothurnocystis is a genus of small enigmatic echinoderms that lived during the Ordovician. Individual animals had a flat boot-shaped body and a thin rod-shaped appendage that may be a stem, or analogous to a foot or a tail. Fossils of Cothurnocystis species have been found in Nevada, Scotland, Czech Republic, France and Morocco.

== Taxonomy ==
The position of the Stylophora, of which Cothurnocystis is a prominent representative, has been in a state of flux. Some scientists claim to be able to see a structurally very basic notochord in the tail, and consequently consider the Stylophora to be a group of primitive chordates, calling them the "Calcichordata". Alternatively these animals are considered related to echinoderms, as the shell (or test) is similar in structure and composition to the tests of echinoderms. However, stylophorans are asymmetric organisms that lack either the radial symmetry typical of most echinoderms, or the bilateral symmetry of the chordates.

== Etymology ==
- C. americana refers to the continent where it was found.
- C. curvata is named for the curved form of its theca.
- C. elizae honors Elizabeth Gray, who collected the specimens upon which the description of this species is based.

== Distribution ==
- C. americana is known from the Lower Ordovician of Nevada (lowest Tremadocian, Whipple Cave Formation, near Lund, White Pine County).
- C. curvata occurs at the Upper Ordovician of Scotland (Starfish Bed of the Drummock Group, Dicellograptus anceps-zone, Thraive Glen, Girvan, Ayrshire).
- C. elizae has been collected in the Lower Ordovician of Morocco (highest Tremadocian to mid Floian, Zagora region), the Upper Ordovician of Scotland (Starfish Bed of the Drummock Group, Dicellograptus anceps-zone, Thraive Glen, Girvan, Ayrshire).
- C. fellinensis is found at the Lower Ordovician of France (Saint-Chinian Formation, Montaigne Noire).

== Description ==
The body of Cothurnocystis consists of a chalice (or theca) and a stem (tail or foot). The theca is flattened, boot-shaped and asymmetrical. The edges of the flat sides of the theca seem to consist of 14 elements, 11 defining the outline of the theca, and 3 are processes, one forming a "toe"-spike, a second a heel-spike and a third a lip-spike. The so-called "obverse"-side ("toe" pointing left), is covered with one thin integument, at the "reverse"-side the integument is interrupted by a "strut" formed by a branch of an element near the attachment of the stem, and a branch of an element at the top of the theca. Approximately from the attachment of the stem to the "toe"-spike, is a structure reminiscent of a windpipe, that has been interpreted as a series of slits in the integument. The attachment of the stem seems to consist of four sets of left and right elements, becoming narrower further from the theca. Further down single and uniform elements of the stem seem comparable to the anatomy of sea lily stems. The "instep" of the boot seems to hold both the mouth and the anus.
