= Creissan =

- Commune
- Coat of arms
- Location of Creissan
- Location within France Location within Occitanie
- Coordinates: 43°22′34″N 3°00′42″E
- Country: France
- Region: Occitania
- Department: Hérault
- Arrondissement: Béziers
- Canton: Saint-Pons-de-Thomières

Government
  - Mayor (2020–2026): Laurent Brunet
- Area^{1}: 8.89 km^{2} (3.43 sq mi)
- Elevation: 54 m (177 ft)
- Highest elevation: 201 m (659 ft)
- Lowest elevation: 73 m (240 ft)
- Population (2023): 1,436
  - Density: 162/km^{2} (418/sq mi)
- Time zone: UTC+01:00 (CET)
  - Summer (DST): UTC+02:00 (CEST)
- INSEE/Postal code: 34089 /34370
- ^{1} French Land Register data, which excludes lakes, ponds, glaciers > 1 km^{2} (0.386 sq mi or 247 acres) and river estuaries.

Creissan (French pronunciation: [kʁesɑ̃]; Languedocien: Creissa) is a commune in the Hérault department in southern France.

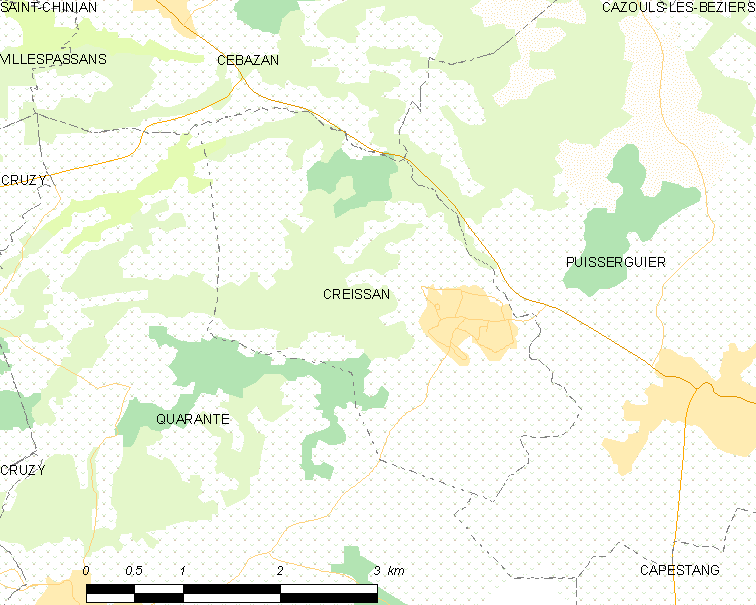
Map

== Population ==
Historical population
Year	Pop.	±% p.a.
1968	475	—
1975	404	−2.29%
1982	654	+7.12%
1990	861	+3.50%
1999	938	+0.96%
2007	1,175	+2.86%
2012	1,326	+2.45%
2017	1,360	+0.51%
2023	1,436	+0.91%
Source: INSEE

== See also ==
- Communes of the Hérault department
