= Saint-Chinian =

- Commune
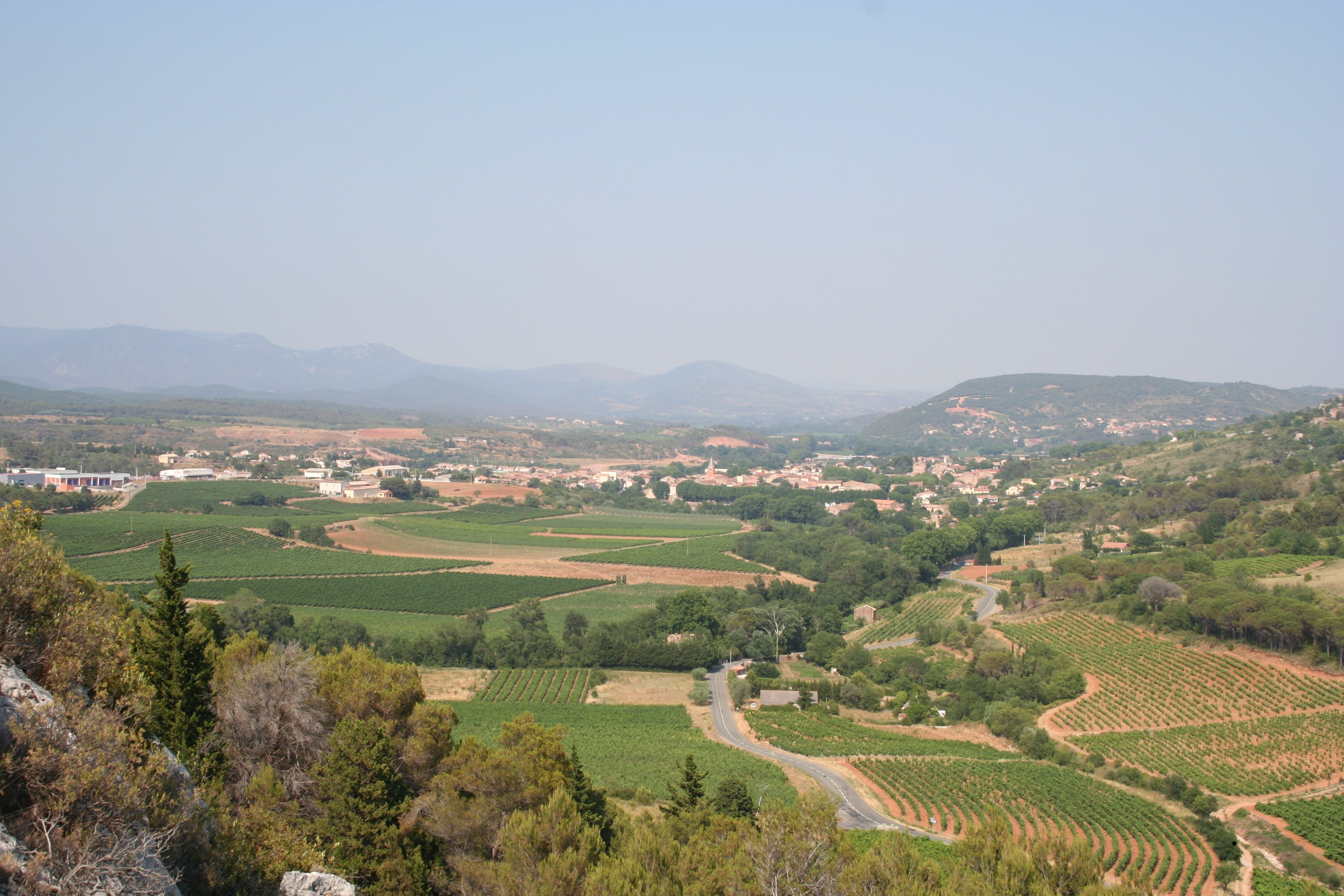
- A general view of Saint-Chinian

- Coat of arms
- Location of Saint-Chinian
- Location within France Location within Occitanie
- Coordinates: 43°25′23″N 2°56′52″E
- Country: France
- Region: Occitania
- Department: Hérault
- Arrondissement: Béziers
- Canton: Saint-Pons-de-Thomières

Government
  - Mayor (2020–2026): Catherine Combes
- Area^{1}: 23.29 km^{2} (8.99 sq mi)
- Elevation: 122 m (400 ft)
- Highest elevation: 631 m (2,070 ft)
- Lowest elevation: 101 m (331 ft)
- Population (2023): 1,811
  - Density: 77.76/km^{2} (201.4/sq mi)
- Time zone: UTC+01:00 (CET)
  - Summer (DST): UTC+02:00 (CEST)
- INSEE/Postal code: 34245 /34360
- ^{1} French Land Register data, which excludes lakes, ponds, glaciers > 1 km^{2} (0.386 sq mi or 247 acres) and river estuaries.

Saint-Chinian (French pronunciation: [sɛ̃ ʃinjɑ̃]; Occitan: Sanch Inhan) is a commune in the Hérault department in the Occitanie region in southern France. The town was the birthplace of the great tenor Agustarello Affre (1858–1931). He is commemorated by a plaque on the house where he was born, on the Avenue de Saint Pons.

== Population ==
Historical population
| Year | Pop. | ±% p.a. |
|---|---|---|
| 1968 | 1,976 | — |
| 1975 | 1,886 | −0.66% |
| 1982 | 1,735 | −1.19% |
| 1990 | 1,705 | −0.22% |
| 1999 | 1,777 | +0.46% |
| 2007 | 1,813 | +0.25% |
| 2012 | 1,813 | +0.00% |
| 2017 | 1,677 | −1.55% |
| 2023 | 1,811 | +1.29% |
Source: INSEE

== Saint-Chinian wine ==
Saint-Chinian has given its name to Saint-Chinian wine, which is classified as Appellation d'Origine Contrôlée (AOC) and covers several communes around Saint-Chinian itself.

== See also ==
- Communes of the Hérault department
