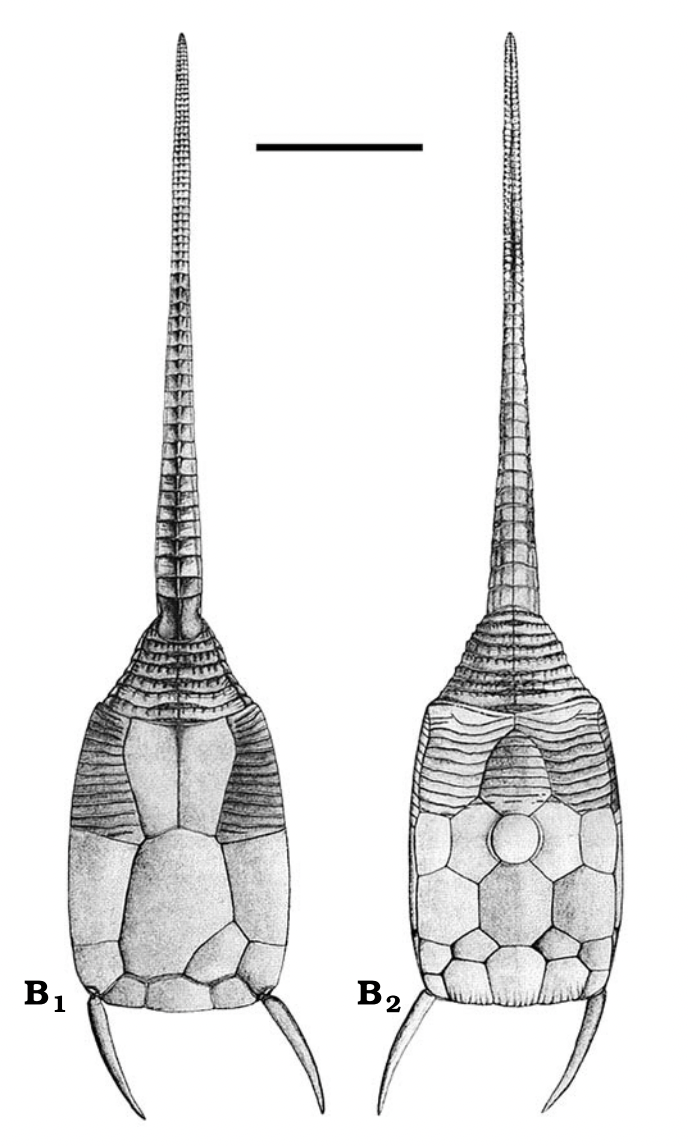
- Rhenocystis latipedunculata ventral/flat (B1) and dorsal/convex (B2) surfaces

Scientific classification
- Kingdom: Animalia
- Phylum: Echinodermata
- Class: †Stylophora
- Order: †Mitrata; Jaekel, 1918

Taxa
- See Taxa

= Mitrate =

Mitrate Temporal range: Cambrian (Guzhangian)–Carboniferous (Morrowan)

Extinct order of marine invertebrates

Mitrates are an extinct group of echinoderms, which are grouped with the cornutes and the basal Ceratocystis to form the Stylophora. Mitrates were central to the now-disproven calcichordate hypothesis of chordate origins, but are now seen as either pre-radial-symmetry stem-group echinoderms, or as a derived group either within the blastozoans or near to the origin of crinoids.

== Morphology ==
The organisms were a few millimetres long. Like the echinoderms, they are covered in armour plates, each of which comprises a single crystal of calcite. This is one of the features they share with the latter group, along with a water vascular system, only discovered in 2019. However, they do not display the familiar fivefold symmetry that more recent echinoderms possess, instead being close to (but not fully) bilaterally symmetrical.

Their heads had two sides; one, flat, was covered with large "pavement-like" plates, the other, convex, bore smaller plates. Their tails were long and segmented, resembling the stalk of a crinoid or the arm of a brittlestar. At the opposite end was a hole which may have been mouth or anus - or both.

They also bear features reminiscent of pharyngeal slits, a character lost in other echinoderms but present in hemichordates. This caused R. P. S. Jefferies to hold them as the ancestor of all chordates, a theory that has since been disproven.

== Behaviour ==
The mitrate Rhenocystis latipedunculata has been found with associated trace fossils. Their interpretation requires an understanding of how the animal was oriented in life; it's not agreed whether the convex side of the head was up or down, or indeed whether the "tail" was at the front or back of the organism. The trace fossils suggest that they pulled themselves through the mud with their "tail", and were flat-side up.

== Taxa ==
The following taxa are recognized as being included in the Mitrata as of a 2002 review of the order:

- Adoketocarpus Ruta & Jell, 1999
- Allanicytidium Caster & Gill, 1967
- Anatifopsis Barrande, 1872
- Anomalocystites Hall, 1859
- Aspidocarpus Ubaghs, 1979
- Ateleocystites Billings, 1858
- Australocystis Caster, 1954
- Balanocystites Barrande, 1887
- Barrandeocarpus Ubaghs, 1979
- Bokkeveldia Ruta & Theron, 1997
- Chauvelia Cripps, 1990
- Chinianocarpos Ubaghs, 1961
- Dalejocystis Prokop, 1963
- Diamphidiocystis Kolata & Guensburg, 1979
- Enoploura Wetherby, 1879
- Eumitrocystella Beisswenger, 1994
- Guichenocarpos Chauvel, 1981
- Jaekelocarpus Kolata, Frest & Mapes, 1991
- Kierocystis Parsley, 1991
- Kopficystis Parsley, 1991
- Lagynocystis Jaekel, 1918
- Milonicystis Chauvel, 1986
- Mitrocystella Jaekel, 1901
- Mitrocystites Barrande, 1887
- Mongolocarpos Rozhnov, 1990
- Notocarpos Philip, 1981
- Occultocystis Haude, 1995
- Ovocarpus Ubaghs, 1994
- Paranacystis Caster, 1954
- Peltocystis Thoral, 1935
- Placocystella Rennie, 1936
- Placocystites de Koninck, 1869
- Protocytidium Ruta & Jell, 1999
- Pseudovictoriacystis Ruta & Jell, 1999
- Rhenocystis Dehm, 1932
- Spermacystis Ubaghs, 1967
- Tasmanicytidium Caster, 1983
- Victoriacystis Gill & Caster, 1960
- Vizcainocarpus Ruta, 1997
- Willmanocystis Kolata & Jollie, 1982
- Yachalicystis Haude, 1995
