= Prades-sur-Vernazobre =

- Commune
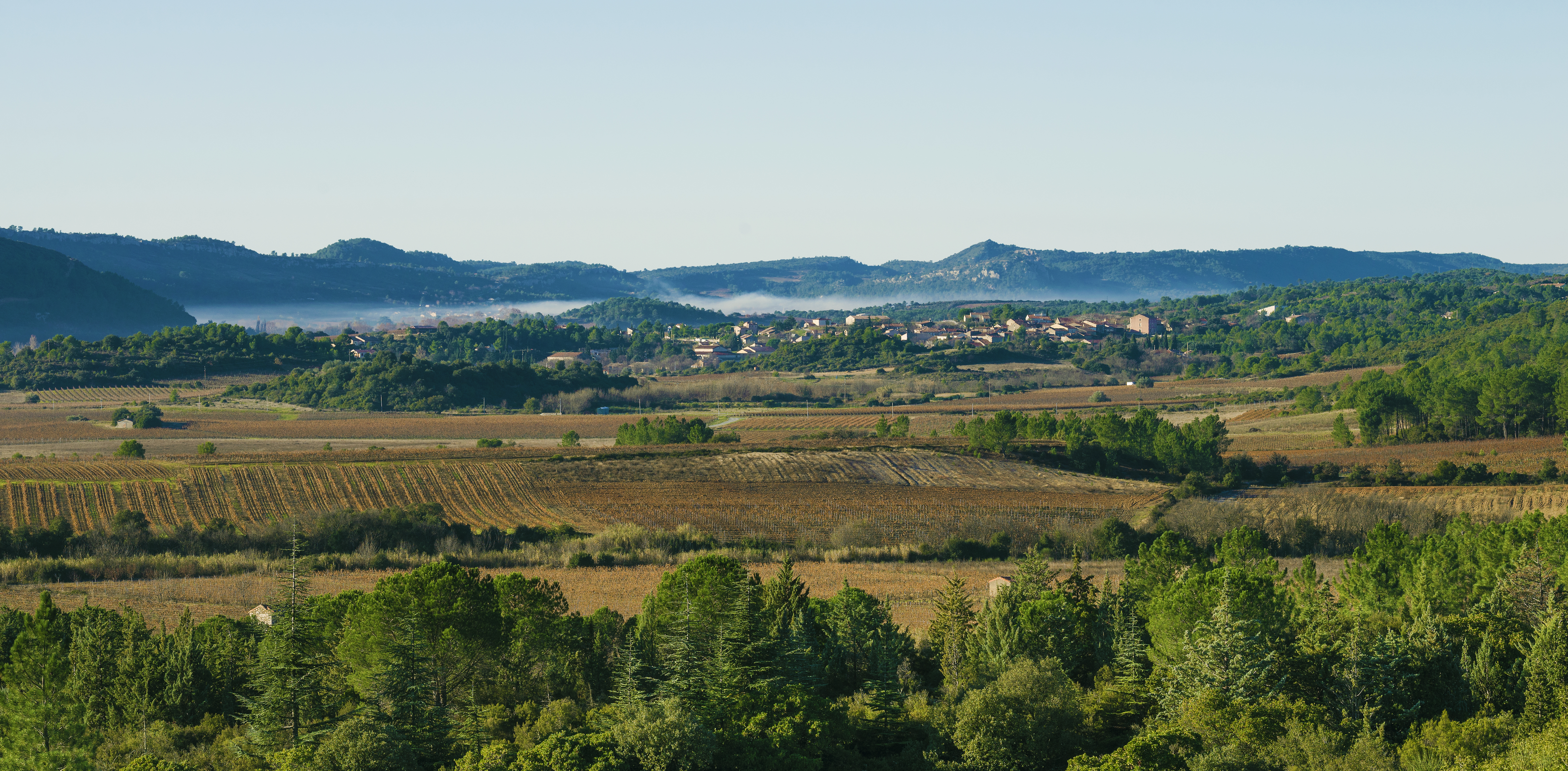
- A general view of Prades-sur-Vernazobre

- Coat of arms
- Location of Prades-sur-Vernazobre
- Location within France Location within Occitanie
- Coordinates: 43°26′54″N 2°59′13″E
- Country: France
- Region: Occitania
- Department: Hérault
- Arrondissement: Béziers
- Canton: Saint-Pons-de-Thomières

Government
  - Mayor (2020–2026): Jean-Marie Milhau
- Area^{1}: 19.98 km^{2} (7.71 sq mi)
- Elevation: 70 m (230 ft)
- Highest elevation: 663 m (2,175 ft)
- Lowest elevation: 64 m (210 ft)
- Population (2023): 374
  - Density: 18.7/km^{2} (48.5/sq mi)
- Time zone: UTC+01:00 (CET)
  - Summer (DST): UTC+02:00 (CEST)
- INSEE/Postal code: 34218 /34360
- ^{1} French Land Register data, which excludes lakes, ponds, glaciers > 1 km^{2} (0.386 sq mi or 247 acres) and river estuaries.

Prades-sur-Vernazobre is a commune in the Hérault department in the Occitanie region in southern France.

== Population ==
Historical population
Year	Pop.	±% p.a.
1968	246	—
1975	228	−1.08%
1982	203	−1.65%
1990	211	+0.48%
1999	236	+1.25%
2007	267	+1.55%
2012	293	+1.88%
2017	310	+1.13%
2023	374	+3.18%
Source: INSEE

== See also ==
- Communes of the Hérault department
