= Crown group =

Monophyletic closure of a set of living species

Clade T is a total group or pan-group, its extant species organized into crown groups C1 and C2. Within clade T are sister clades T1 and C2. Clade T1 comprises crown group C1 and the stem group S1 which is the set of extinct species that are closer to C1 than any other crown group of extant species.

In phylogenetics, the crown group, crown clade, or crown assemblage is a collection of species composed of the living representatives of the collection, the most recent common ancestor of the collection, and all descendants of the most recent common ancestor. It is thus a way of defining a clade, a group consisting of a species and all its extant or extinct descendants. For example, Aves (birds) can be defined as a crown group, which includes the most recent common ancestor of all modern birds, and all of its extant or extinct descendants.

The concept was developed by Willi Hennig, the formulator of phylogenetic systematics, as a way of classifying living organisms relative to their extinct relatives in his "Die Stammesgeschichte der Insekten", and the "crown" and "stem" group terminology was coined by R. P. S. Jefferies in 1979. Though formulated in the 1970s, the term was not commonly used until its reintroduction in 2000 by Graham Budd and Sören Jensen.

== Contents of the crown group ==
It is not necessary for a species to have living descendants in order for it to be included in the crown group. Extinct side branches on the family tree that are descended from the most recent common ancestor of living members will still be part of a crown group. For example, if we consider the crown-birds (i.e. all extant birds and the rest of the family tree back to their most recent common ancestor), extinct side branches like the dodo or great auk are still descended from the most recent common ancestor of all living birds, so fall within the bird crown group. One very simplified cladogram for birds is shown below:

- Avialae
  - †Archaeopteryx
  - - other extinct groups
    - Aves (modern birds, some recently extinct)

In this diagram, the clade labelled "Aves" is the crown group of birds: it includes the most recent common ancestor of all living birds and its descendants, living or not. Although often considered as birds (i.e. members of the clade Avialae), Archaeopteryx and other extinct groups are not included in the crown group, as they fall outside Aves, being descended from earlier ancestors.

An alternative definition does not require any members of a crown group to be extant, only to have resulted from a "major cladogenesis event". The first definition forms the basis of this article.

Sometimes the crown group is given the designation "crown-", to distinguish it from the group as traditionally defined. Both birds and mammals have been traditionally defined by their traits, and contain fossil members that lived before the last common ancestors of the living groups or, like the mammal Haldanodon, were not descended from that ancestor although they lived later. Crown-Aves and Crown-Mammalia therefore differ slightly in content from the traditional usages of Aves and Mammalia. This has caused some confusion in the literature.

== Other groups under the crown group concept ==
The cladistic idea of strictly using the topology of the phylogenetic tree to define groups necessitates other definitions than crown groups to adequately define commonly discussed fossil groups. Thus, a host of prefixes have been defined to describe various branches of the phylogenetic tree relative to extant organisms.

=== Pan-group ===
A pan-group or total group is the crown group and all organisms more closely related to it than to any other extant organisms. In a tree analogy, it is the crown group and all branches back to (but not including) the split with the closest branch to have living members. The Pan-Aves thus contain the living birds and all (fossil) organisms more closely related to birds than to crocodilians (their closest living relatives). The phylogenetic lineage leading back from Aves to the point where it merges with the crocodilian lineage, along with all side branches, constitutes pan-birds. In addition to non-crown group primitive birds like Archaeopteryx, Hesperornis and Confuciusornis, therefore, pan-group birds would include all dinosaurs and pterosaurs as well as an assortment of non-crocodilian animals like Marasuchus.

Pan-Mammalia consists of all mammals and their fossil ancestors back to the phylogenetic split from the remaining amniotes (the Sauropsida). Pan-Mammalia is thus an alternative name for Synapsida, in much the same way the previously-named Pan-Aves would be synonymous with Avemetatarsalia.

=== Stem groups ===
A stem group is a paraphyletic assemblage composed of the members of a pan-group or total group, above, minus the crown group itself (and therefore minus all living members of the pan-group). This leaves primitive relatives of the crown groups, back along the phylogenetic line to (but not including) the last common ancestor of the crown group and their closest living relatives. It follows from the definition that all members of a stem group are extinct. The "stem group" is the most used and most important of the concepts linked to crown groups, as it offers a means to reify and name paraphyletic assemblages of fossils that otherwise do not fit into systematics based on living organisms.

While often attributed to Jefferies (1979), Willmann (2003) traced the origin of the stem group concept to Austrian systematist Othenio Abel (1914), and it was discussed and diagrammed in English as early as 1933 by A. S. Romer.

Alternatively, the term "stem group" is sometimes used in a narrower sense to cover any members of the traditional taxon falling outside the crown group, such as the first cynodonts in the late Triassic being the first stem mammals. Permian synapsids like Dimetrodon or Anteosaurus are stem mammals in the wider sense but not in the narrower one.

Often, an (extinct) grouping is identified as belonging together. Later, it may be realized other (extant) groupings actually emerged within such grouping, rendering them a stem grouping. Cladistically, the new groups should then be added to the group, as paraphyletic groupings are not natural. In any case, stem groupings with living descendants should not be viewed as a cohesive group, but their tree should be further resolved to reveal the full bifurcating phylogeny.

==== Examples of stem groups (in the wider sense) ====
Stem birds perhaps constitute the most cited example of a stem group, as the phylogeny of this group is fairly well known. The following cladogram, based on Benton (2005), illustrates the concept († denotes extinct taxa):

- Archosauria
  - "pan-Crocodylia"
    - Crocodylia
  - Pan-Aves
    - †Pterosauria
    - Dinosauria
      - †Ornithischia
        - †Ornithopoda
          †Hadrosauridae
        - †Thyreophora
          †Stegosauria
      - Saurischia
        - †Sauropoda
        - Theropoda
          - †Ceratosauria
          - Tetanurae
            - †Allosauroidea
            - Coelurosauria
              - †Tyrannosauroidea
              - Maniraptora
                - †Dromaeosauridae (including Velociraptor)
                - Avialae
                  - †Archaeopteryx
                  - Aves
                    - Neognathae
                      (including most living birds)
                    - Paleognathae
                      (including ostriches, emus, etc)

The crown group here is Aves, all modern bird lineages back to their last common ancestor. The closest living relatives of birds are crocodylians. If we follow the phylogenetic lineage leading to Aves to the left, the line itself and all side branches belong to the stem birds until the lineage merges with that of the crocodylians. In addition to non-crown group primitive birds like Archaeopteryx, Hesperornis and Confuciusornis, stem group birds include the non-avian dinosaurs and the pterosaurs. The last common ancestor of birds and crocodilians—the first crown group archosaur—was neither bird nor crocodilian and possessed none of the features unique to either. As the bird stem group evolved, distinctive bird features such as feathers and hollow bones appeared. Finally, at the base of the crown group, all traits common to extant birds were present.

Under the widely used total-group perspective, the Crocodylomorpha would become synonymous with the Crocodilia, and the Avemetatarsalia would become synonymous with the birds, and the above tree could be summarized as

- Archosauria
  - Crocodilia
  - Birds

An advantage of this approach is that declaring Theropoda to be stem-birds (i.e., non-avian Pan-Aves) is more specific than declaring it to be a member of the Archosauria, which would not exclude it from the Crocodylia branch. Basal branch names such as Pan-Aves are usually more obscure. However, not so advantageous are the facts that "Pan-Aves" and "Aves" are not the same group, the circumscription of the concept of "Pan-Aves" (synonymous with Avemetatarsalia) is only evident by examination of the above tree, and calling both groups "birds" is ambiguous.

Stem mammals are those in the lineage leading to living mammals, together with side branches, from the divergence of the lineage from the Sauropsida to the last common ancestor of the living mammals. This group includes the synapsids as well as mammaliaforms like the morganucodonts and the docodonts; the latter groups have traditionally and anatomically been considered mammals even though they fall outside the crown group mammals.

Stem tetrapods are the animals belonging to the lineage leading to tetrapods from their divergence from the lungfish, our nearest relatives among the fishes. In addition to a series of lobe-finned fishes, they also include some of the early labyrinthodonts. Exactly what labyrinthodonts are in the stem group tetrapods rather than the corresponding crown group is uncertain, as the phylogeny of early tetrapods is not well understood. This example shows that crown and stem group definitions are of limited value when there is no consensus phylogeny.

Stem arthropods constitute a group that has seen attention in connection with the Burgess Shale fauna. Several of the finds, including the enigmatic Opabinia and Anomalocaris have some, though not all, features associated with arthropods, and are thus considered stem arthropods. The sorting of the Burgess Shale fauna into various stem groups finally enabled phylogenetic sorting of this enigmatic assemblage and also allowed for identifying velvet worms as the closest living relatives of arthropods.

Stem priapulids are other early Cambrian to middle Cambrian faunas, appearing in Chengjiang to Burgess Shale. The genus Ottoia has more or less the same build as modern priapulids, but phylogenetic analysis indicates that it falls outside the crown group, making it a stem priapulid.

=== Plesion-group ===
The name plesion has a long history in biological systematics, and plesion group has acquired several meanings over the years. One use is as "nearby group" (plesion means close to in Greek), i.e. sister group to a given taxon, whether that group is a crown group or not. The term may also mean a group, possibly paraphyletic, defined by primitive traits (i.e. symplesiomorphies). It is generally taken to mean a side branch splitting off earlier on the phylogenetic tree than the group in question.

== Palaeontological significance of stem and crown groups ==
Placing fossils in their right order in a stem group allows the order of these acquisitions to be established, and thus the ecological and functional setting of the evolution of the major features of the group in question. Stem groups thus offer a route to integrate unique palaeontological data into questions of the evolution of living organisms. Furthermore, they show that fossils that were considered to lie in their own separate group because they did not show all the diagnostic features of a living clade, can nevertheless be related to it by lying in its stem group. Such fossils have been of particular importance in considering the origins of the tetrapods, mammals, and animals.

The application of the stem group concept also influenced the interpretation of the organisms of the Burgess Shale. Their classification in stem groups to extant phyla, rather than in phyla of their own, is thought by some to make the Cambrian explosion easier to understand without invoking unusual evolutionary mechanisms; however, application of the stem group concept does nothing to ameliorate the difficulties that phylogenetic telescoping poses to evolutionary theorists attempting to understand both macroevolutionary change and the abrupt character of the Cambrian explosion. Overemphasis on the stem group concept threatens to delay or obscure proper recognition of new higher taxa.

== Stem groups in systematics ==
As originally proposed by Karl-Ernst Lauterbach, stem groups should be given the prefix "stem" (i.e. Stem-Aves, Stem-Arthropoda), however the crown group should have no prefix. The latter has not been universally accepted for known groups. A number of paleontologists have opted to apply this approach anyway.
