= Pharyngeal slit =

Repeated openings that appear along the pharynx of chordates

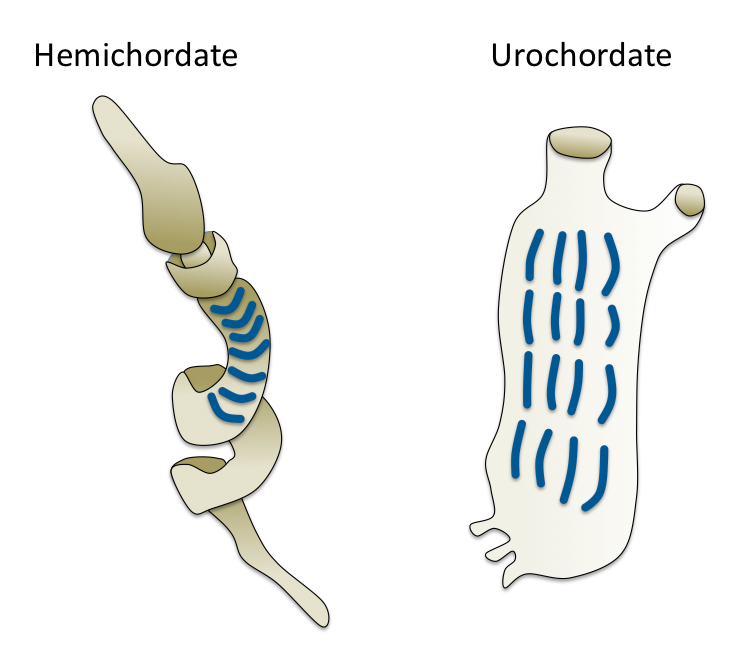
The presence of gill slits (in blue) in an acorn worm (left) and a tunicate (right).

Pharyngeal slits are filter-feeding organs found among deuterostomes. Pharyngeal slits are repeated openings that appear along the pharynx caudal to the mouth. With this position, they allow for the movement of water in the mouth and out the pharyngeal slits. It is postulated that this is how pharyngeal slits first assisted in filter-feeding, and later, with the addition of gills along their walls, aided in respiration of aquatic chordates. These repeated segments are controlled by similar developmental mechanisms. Some hemichordate species can have as many as 200 gill slits. Pharyngeal clefts resembling gill slits are transiently present during the embryonic stages of tetrapod development. The presence of pharyngeal arches and clefts in the neck of the developing human embryo famously led Ernst Haeckel to postulate that "ontogeny recapitulates phylogeny"; this hypothesis, while false, contains elements of truth, as explored by Stephen Jay Gould in Ontogeny and Phylogeny. However, it is now accepted that it is the vertebrate pharyngeal pouches and not the neck slits that are homologous to the pharyngeal slits of invertebrate chordates. Pharyngeal arches, pouches, and clefts are, at some stage of life, found in all chordates. One theory of their origin is the fusion of nephridia which opened both on the outside and the gut, creating openings between the gut and the environment.

== Pharyngeal arches in vertebrates ==
In vertebrates, the pharyngeal arches are derived from all three germ layers. Neural crest cells enter these arches where they contribute to craniofacial features such as bone and cartilage. However, the existence of pharyngeal structures before neural crest cells evolved is indicated by the existence of neural crest-independent mechanisms of pharyngeal arch development. The first, most anterior pharyngeal arch gives rise to the oral jaw. The second arch becomes the hyoid and jaw support. In fish, the other posterior arches contribute to the brachial skeleton, which support the gills; in tetrapods the anterior arches develop into components of the ear, tonsils, and thymus. The genetic and developmental basis of pharyngeal arch development is well characterized. It has been shown that Hox genes and other developmental genes such as dlx are important for patterning the anterior/posterior and dorsal/ventral axes of the branchial arches. Some fish species have jaws in their throat, known as pharyngeal jaws, which develop using the same genetic pathways involved in oral jaw formation.

== Evolution of pharyngeal slits ==
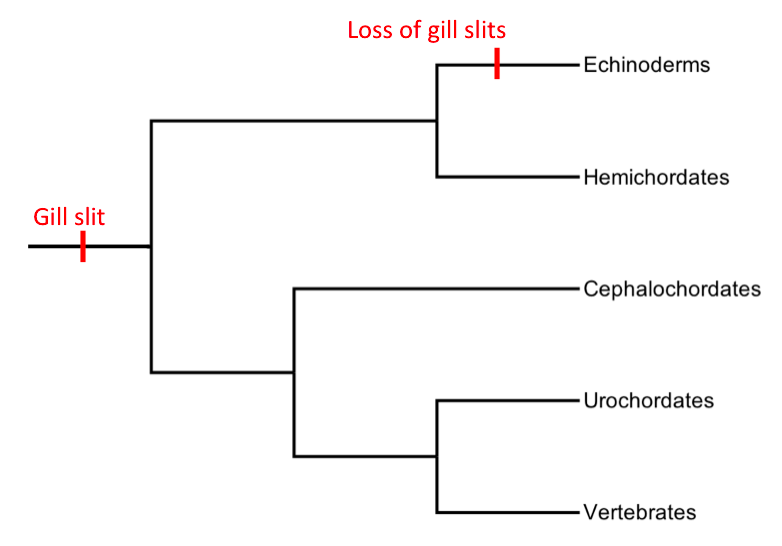
A phylogeny showing when gill slits may have arisen. It is thought that gill slits were subsequently lost in echinoderms.

The presence of pharyngeal slits in hemichordates led to debates of whether this structure was homologous to the slits found in chordates or a result of convergent evolution. With the placement of hemichordates and echinoderms as a sister group to chordates, a new hypothesis has emerged—suggesting that pharyngeal gill slits were present in the deuterostome ancestor. Extant echinoderms lack pharyngeal structures, but fossil records reveal that ancestral forms of echinoderms had gill-like structures. Comparative developmental and genetic studies of these pharyngeal structures between hemichordates and urochordates have brought about important insights regarding the evolution of the deuterostome body plan. Comparative molecular biology has revealed that the Pax 1 and Pax 9 genes (which encode for transcription factors) are expressed in similar patterns between hemichordates and urochordates. In vertebrates, Pax 1 and Pax 9 are expressed in the pharyngeal pouches and are important for thymus development. Applying excess retinoic acid (excess retinoic acid in vertebrates results in pharyngeal abnormalities) leads to the absence of gill slits in developing amphioxi, suggesting that retinoic acid may act through the same mechanism in vertebrates and amphioxi. These studies indicate that the pharyngeal slits found in hemichordates and chordates are indeed homologous in a molecular sense.
