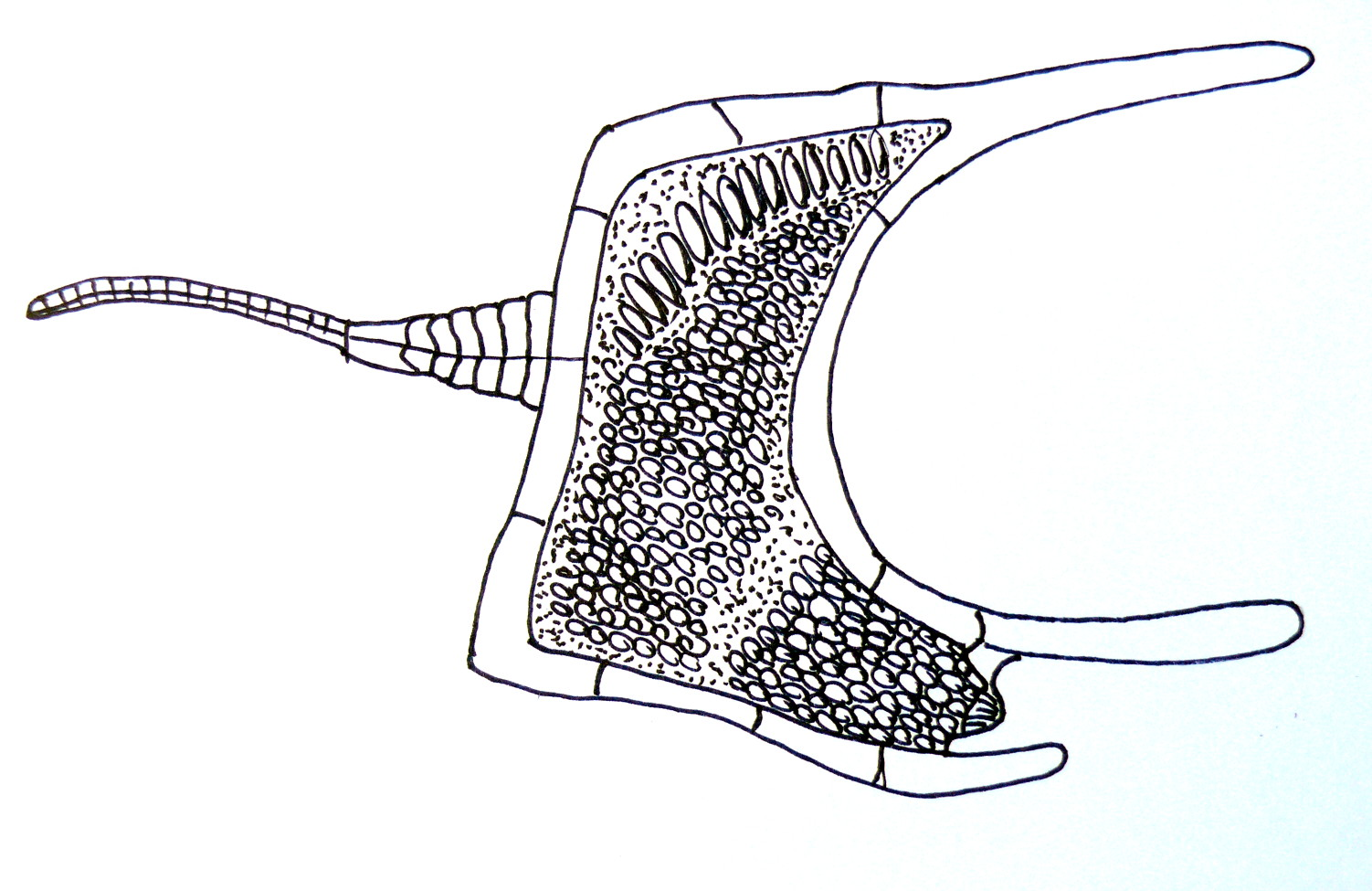
- Reconstruction of the cornute Cothurnocystis
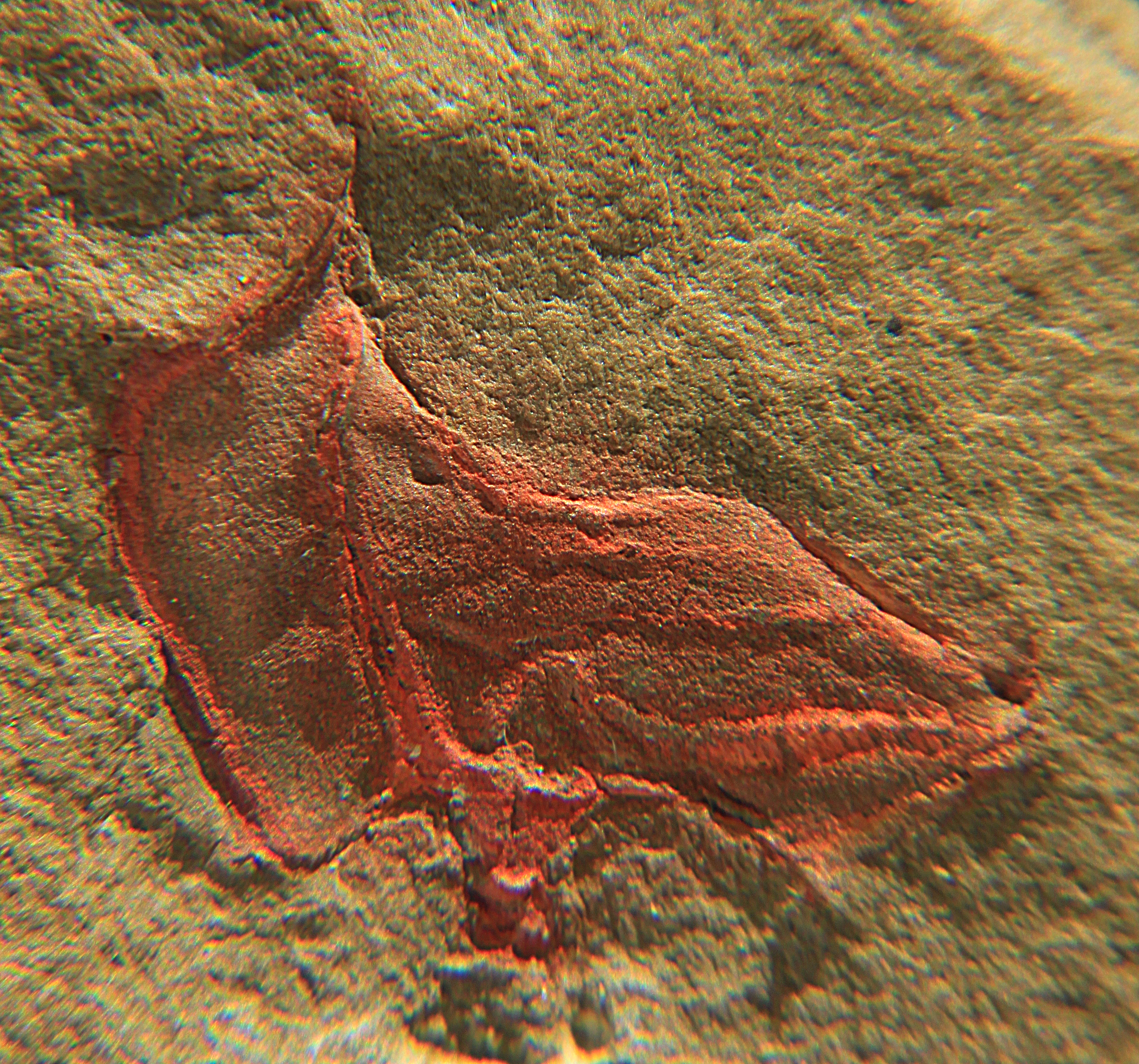
- Fossil of Cothurnocystis elizae

Scientific classification
- Kingdom: Animalia
- Phylum: Echinodermata
- Class: †Stylophora
- Order: †Cornuta; Jaekel, 1901

Taxa
- See Taxa

= Cornuta =

Cornuta Temporal range: Middle Cambrian–Late Ordovician (Rawtheyan)

Extinct order of marine invertebrates

Cornuta is an extinct order of echinoderms. Along with the mitrates, they form the Stylophora.

Their first (probable) representative is Ponticulocarpus from the Spence Shale (mid Cambrian); Ordovician examples also exist.

== Taxa ==
As of 2002, the following taxa were recognized as being included in the order Cornuta:

- Acuticarpus Sumrall, Sprinkle & Guensburg, 1997
- Amygdalotheca Ubaghs, 1969
- Ampelocarpus Lefebvre & Vizcaïno, 1999
- Arauricystis Lefebvre & Vizcaïno, 1999
- Archaeocothurnus Sumrall, Sprinkle & Guensburg, 1997
- Babinocystis Rozhnov, 1990
- Beryllia Cripps & Daley, 1994
- Bohemiaecystis Caster, 1967
- Ceratocystis Jaekel, 1901
- Chauvelicystis Ubaghs, 1969
- Cothurnocystis Bather, 1913
- Domfrontia Cripps & Daley, 1994
- Drepanocarpos Smith & Jell, 1999
- Flabellicystis Martí Mus, 2002
- Galliaecystis Ubaghs, 1969
- Hanusia Cripps, 1989
- Juliaecarpus Ruta, 1999
- Lobocarpus Ubaghs, 1998
- Lyricocarpus Ubaghs, 1994
- Milonicystis Chauvel, 1986
- Nanocarpus Ubaghs, 1991
- Nevadaecystis Ubaghs, 1967
- Phyllocystis Thoral, 1935
- Ponticulocarpus Sumrall & Sprinkle, 1999
- Prochauvelicystis Daley, 1992
- Procothurnocystis Woods & Jefferies, 1992
- Progalliacystis Cripps, 1989
- Prokopicystis Cripps, 1989
- Proscotiaecystis Ubaghs, 1994
- Protocystites Hicks, 1872
- Reticulocarpos Jefferies & Prokop, 1972
- Scotiaecystis Caster & Ubaghs, 1967
- Thoralicystis Chauvel, 1971
- Trigonocarpus Ubaghs, 1994

== See also ==
- Cothurnocystidae
