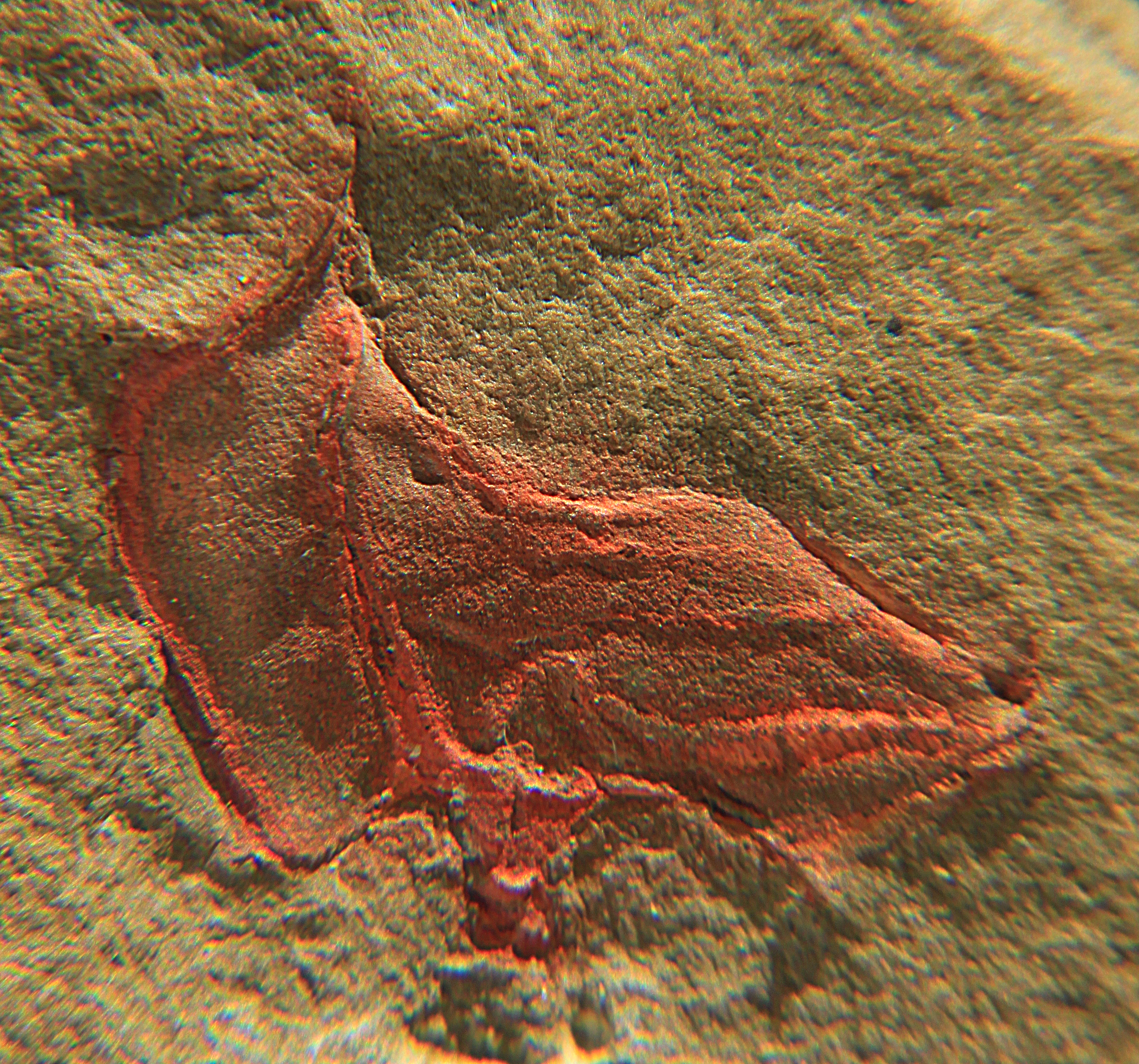
- Cothurnocystis elizae

Scientific classification
- Kingdom: Animalia
- Superphylum: Deuterostomia
- Clade: Ambulacraria
- Phylum: Echinodermata
- Class: †Stylophora; Gill & Caster, 1960

Orders
- Order †Cornuta; Order †Mitrata; Family †Ceratocystidae

= Stylophora =

Stylophora Temporal range: Middle Cambrian–Carboniferous, Pennsylvanian (Morrowan)

Extinct group of marine invertebrates

The Stylophora are an extinct class of paleozoic echinoderms, comprising the cornutes, the mitrates, and the basal ceratocystids. It is synonymous with the subphylum Calcichordata. Their unusual appearances have led to a variety of very different reconstructions of their anatomy, how they lived, and their relationships to other organisms.

Stylophorans have played a major role in debates over the origin of chordates, as under the calcichordate hypothesis they were interpreted as being stem-group chordates. However, multiple lines of evidence argue against the calcichordate hypothesis, and stylophorans are now widely agreed to belong to the echinoderm total group. Debate remains over whether they are stem-group echinoderms which predate the origin of radial symmetry, or highly modified descendants of radially symmetric echinoderms.

== Description ==
The general stylophoran body plan consists of a flattened theca and a single jointed appendage which extends from it. Stylophoran tests are composed of stereom calcite plates, which has traditionally been the basis for assigning them to Echinodermata. However, they also lack the radial symmetry characteristic of most other echinoderms, with the earlier members of the group being flattened and asymmetrical, and the later ones closer to bilateral symmetry.

In Mitrocystites and perhaps in other forms the appendage does not end in an attachment organ, and may have served the organism for movement. Cothurnocystis is asymmetrical and boot-shaped, and Mitrocystites is bilaterally symmetrical and more streamlined.

There were three major hypotheses about the anatomy and systematics of stylophorans.

The earliest idea, proposed by Ubaghs was that the group was aberrant echnoderms with a single starfish-like feeding arm. In the calcichordate hypothesis proposed by Richard Jeffries, it was suggested that some or all stylophorans might have had gill slits like chordates, and the appendage was a tail that contained a notochord. This reconstruction led to the hypothesis that some or all of the stylophorans may have been ancestral to the chordate branch of the deuterostomes, rather than being within the echinoderms.

An alternative hypothesis (proposed by D.G. Shu, Simon Conway Morris, and others) suggested that stylophorans were ecologically stalked echinoderms. The appendage was reconstructed as a stalk to attach the animal to the sea floor, but the hypothesis proposed the group was close to the ancestor of both echinoderms and hemichordates, and the stalk contained a notochord-like element or neural tube. Both hypotheses of chordate relationships were later disproven by the discovery of fossil soft tissues in a study published in 2019.

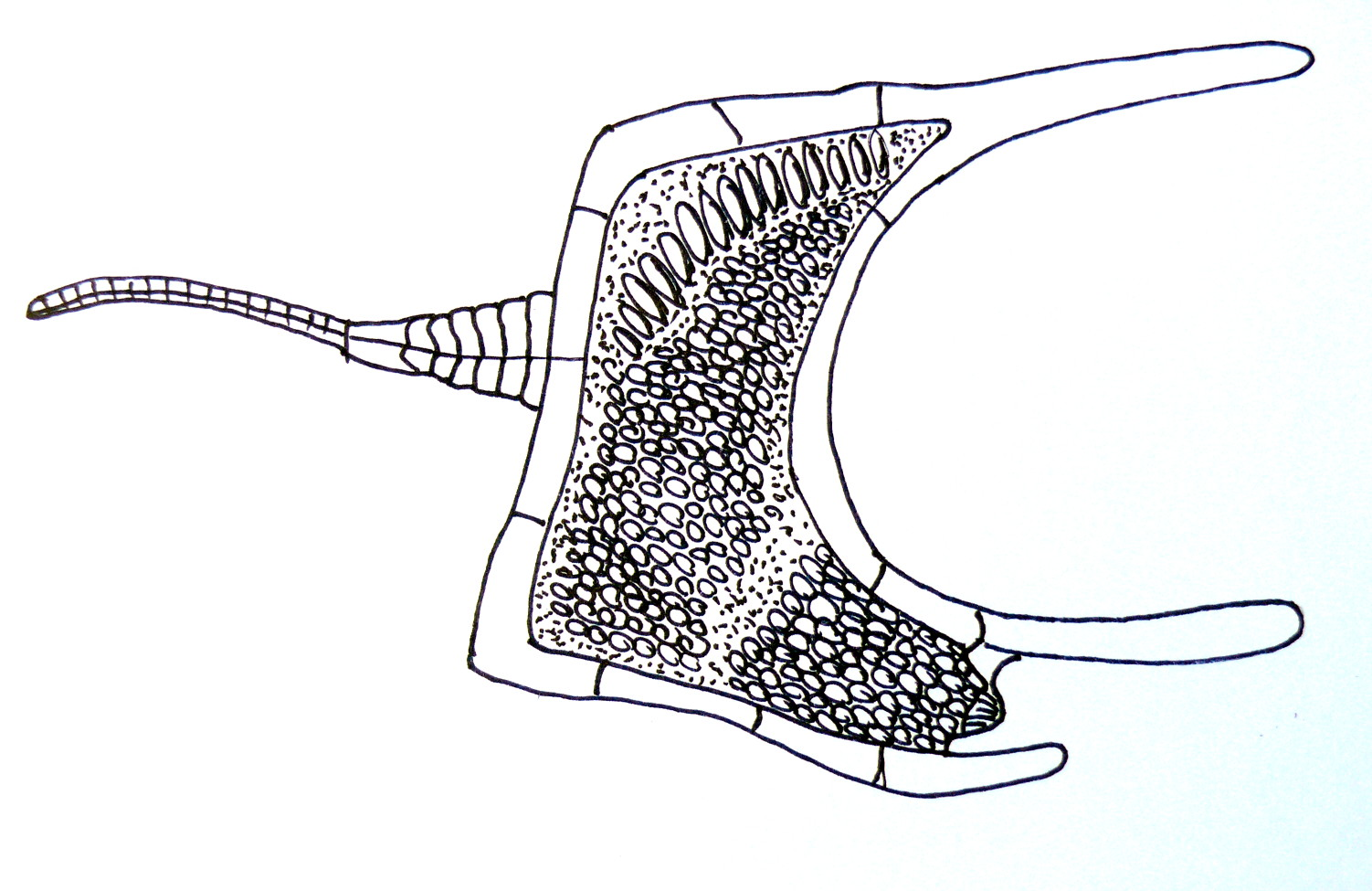
Life reconstruction of Cothurnocystis

Scanning electron microscopy of preserved soft tissues in the single appendage of two genera of stylophorans showed the appendage contained an ambulacral canal with tube feet covered by mobile plates, and was not a tail or stalk with fixed plates covering a notochord or neural tube. The appendage is therefore interpreted as a starfish-like feeding arm. The enlarged base of the arm contains an extension of the body cavity rather than muscle blocks to move a tail; the structure at the base of the arm is most parsimoniously reconstructed as the mouth. Stylophorans are therefore reconstructed as true echinoderms of uncertain affiliations, without radial symmetry but with stereom and a water vascular system. The body was oriented with the arm as the anterior end of the animal, which lay on the substrate; food would have been captured by tube feet and moved down the arm to the mouth. Some genera may have also used the water vascular system for locomotion. Rather than swimming with a muscular post-anal tail as in chordates, mobile genera would have crawled "arm-first" using a water vascular system, like starfish and sea cucumbers.

== Classification ==
There are over 120 known species of stylophoran. Stylophora is conventionally divided into two orders, Cornuta and Mitrata. Mitrates may have evolved from cornutes, which would render the cornutes paraphyletic. An alternate taxonomy regards the mitrates and mitrate-like cornutes as forming the order Ankyroida, while maintaining the order Cornuta for the less mitrate-like cornutes. The most basal known stylophoran is Ceratocystis.

== See also ==
- List of echinodermata orders
- Homalozoa
- Calcichordate Theory
- Edrioasteroidea
- Helicoplacoidea
- Blastozoa
