= 2022 in paleontology =

Paleontology or palaeontology is the study of prehistoric life forms on Earth through the examination of plant and animal fossils. This includes the study of body fossils, tracks (ichnites), burrows, cast-off parts, fossilised feces (coprolites), palynomorphs and chemical residues. Because humans have encountered fossils for millennia, paleontology has a long history both before and after becoming formalized as a science. This article records significant discoveries and events related to paleontology that occurred or were published in the year 2022.

== Flora ==
=== Fungi ===
==== Newly named fungi ====
Name	Novelty	Status	Authors	Age	Type locality	Location	Notes	Images
Meliolinites bhutanensis	Sp. nov	In press	Bera et al.	Miocene-Pliocene		Bhutan	A member of the family Meliolaceae.	
Zygosporium miochinensis	Sp. nov		Bera et al.	Pliocene		Bhutan	A member of Xylariales belonging to the family Zygosporiaceae.	
Zygosporium oligocenicum	Sp. nov		Worobiec in Worobiec & Erdei	Oligocene		Hungary	A member of Xylariales belonging to the family Zygosporiaceae.	
Zygosporium palaeotuberculatum	Sp. nov		Bera et al.	Miocene-Pliocene		India	A member of Xylariales belonging to the family Zygosporiaceae.	

==== Mycological research ====
- A study on the anatomy of specimens of Prototaxites from the Heider quarry in Germany and the Bordeaux quarry in Canada is published by Vajda et al. (2022), who interpret specimens of Prototaxites as fungi and as rhizomorphs.
- Yang et al. (2022) describe new fossil material of Daohugouthallus ciliiferus from the Jurassic Jiulongshan Formation (China), providing evidence that this macrolichen inhabited a gymnosperm branch, and name a new family Daohugouthallaceae placed within the class Lecanoromycetes.

=== "Algae" ===
Name	Novelty	Status	Authors	Age	Type locality	Location	Notes	Images
Amsassia talimuensis	Sp. nov	Valid	Shen, Liu & Wu	Ordovician	Lianglitage Formation	China	A calcareous organism, probably a green alga with affinities to Cladophora.	
Calathophycus	Gen. et sp. nov	Valid	Tang in Tang et al.	Cambrian (Fortunian)	Kuanchuanpu Formation	China	Probably a eukaryotic multicellular alga of uncertain affinities. Genus includes new species C. irregulatus.	
Jiuqunaoella sergeevii	Sp. nov		Singh & Sharma	Mesoproterozoic	Singhora Group	India	A multicellular eukaryote, probably an alga.	
Palaeoscytosiphon	Gen. et sp. nov		Singh & Sharma	Mesoproterozoic	Singhora Group	India	A multicellular eukaryote, probably a brown alga. Genus includes new species P. shuklaii.	
Qingjiangthallus	Gen. et sp. nov		Li & Zhang in Li et al.	Cambrian Stage 3	Shuijingtuo Formation	China	A red alga, possibly a member of the family Florideophyceae. Genus includes new species Q. cystocarpium.	
Reptamsassia	Gen. et 2 sp. nov	Valid	Lee, Elias & Pratt	Ordovician (Floian)	Boat Harbour Formation	Canada (Newfoundland and Labrador)	A calcareous alga (possibly green alga) related to Amsassia. Genus includes new species R. divergens and R. minuta.	

=== Floral research ===
- Sforna et al. (2022) report the discovery of bound nickel-tetrapyrrole moieties preserved within cells of a ~1-billion-years-old eukaryote Arctacellularia tetragonala from the BII Group of the Mbuji-Mayi Supergroup (Democratic Republic of the Congo), identify the tetrapyrrole moieties as chlorophyll derivatives, and interpret A. tetragonala as one of the earliest known multicellular algae.
- A study on the mode of preservation of macroalgae and associated filamentous microfossils from the Tonian Dolores Creek Formation (Yukon, Canada) is published by Maloney et al. (2022).
- Li et al. (2022) study the morphology and growth features of Gesinella, and interpret this organism as a likely eukaryotic macroalga and a benthic metaphyte.
- Retallack (2022) argues that Late Silurian and Early Devonian nematophytes would have towered over land plants from the same fossil plant assemblages, including vascular plant trees, that nematophytes were branched and formed closed canopies, that there were extensive networks of nutrient-gathering glomeromycotan mycorrhizae in Ordovician to Devonian paleosols, and that the environment with nematophytes as the tallest elements of terrestrial vegetation and soils riddled with mycorrhizae may have nurtured, sheltered and facilitated the evolution of early land plants.

== Cnidarians ==
=== Newly named cnidarians ===
Name	Novelty	Status	Authors	Age	Type locality	Country	Notes	Images
Acropora suwanneensis	Sp. nov	Valid	Wallace & Portell	Early Oligocene	Suwannee Limestone	United States (Florida)	A species of Acropora.	
Acropora upchurchi	Sp. nov	Valid	Wallace & Portell	Early Oligocene	Suwannee Limestone	United States (Florida)	A species of Acropora.	
Arctophyllum shuangjingziense	Sp. nov		Yang et al.	Carboniferous (Pennsylvanian)		China	A rugose coral.	
Auroralumina	Gen. et sp. nov	Valid	Dunn et al.	Ediacaran	Bradgate Formation	United Kingdom	A stem-medusozoan. The type species is A. attenboroughii.	
Corwenia tirhelensis	Sp. nov	In press	Rodríguez et al.	Carboniferous (Bashkirian)	Tirhela Formation	Morocco	A rugose coral belonging to the family Aulophyllidae.	
Glyptoconularia antiatlasica	Sp. nov	Valid	Van Iten, Gutiérrez-Marco & Cournoyer	Ordovician (Darriwilian)	Taddrist Formation	Morocco	A conulariid.	
Gracilopora delicata	Sp. nov	Valid	Niko	Devonian (Givetian)	Naidaijin Formation	Japan	A coral belonging to the group Favositida and the family Pachyporidae.	
Grypophyllum schroederi	Sp. nov	Valid	Coen-Aubert	Devonian (Givetian)	Dreimühlen Formation	Germany	A rugose coral belonging to the family Ptenophyllidae.	
Heterocyathus filkorni	Sp. nov	In press	Videira-Santos, Tobin & Scheffler	Late Cretaceous (Santonian to Campanian)	Santa Marta Formation	Antarctica	A species of Heterocyathus.	
?Holoconularia rossica	Sp. nov		Van Iten, Mironenko & Vinn	Carboniferous (Serpukhovian)	Gurovo Formation	Russia	A conulariid.	
Ilankirus	Gen. et sp. nov	Valid	Sarsembaev & Marusin	Cambrian Stage 2		Russia	A conulariid. Genus includes new species I. kessyusensis.	
Klaamannipora densitabulata	Sp. nov	Valid	Niko	Devonian (Givetian)	Naidaijin Formation	Japan	A coral belonging to the group Favositida and the family Favositidae.	
Lafustalcyon	Gen. et sp. nov	In press	Denayer et al.	Carboniferous (Serpukhovian)		France	An alcyonacean octocoral. Genus includes new species L. vachardi.	
Macgeea mistiaeni	Sp. nov	Valid	Coen-Aubert	Devonian (Givetian)	Dreimühlen Formation	Germany	A rugose coral belonging to the family Phillipsastreidae.	
Marennophyllum	Gen. et comb. et sp. nov	Valid	Coen-Aubert	Devonian (Givetian)	Mont d'Haurs Formation	Belgium; Germany	A rugose coral belonging to the family Cystiphyllidae. The type species is "Cystiphylloides" marennense Coen-Aubert (2019); genus also includes "Paralytophyllum" praecipuum Wedekind & Vollbrecht (1931), as well as new species M. wenningi.	
Octapyrgites denticulus	Sp. nov	Valid	Yong et al.	Cambrian	Kuanchuanpu Formation	China	A microscopic, sedentary medusozoan.	
Paraconularia ediacara	Sp. nov		Leme, Van Iten & Simões	Latest Ediacaran	Tamengo Formation	Brazil	The earliest so far confirmed conulariid cnidarian.	
Pinacopora baltica	Sp. nov	Valid	Plusquellec, Eyzenga & van Keulen	Ordovician (Katian)		Germany	A tabulate coral belonging to the group Heliolitida and the family Proporidae.	
Pseudofavosites asoensis	Sp. nov	Valid	Niko	Devonian (Givetian)	Naidaijin Formation	Japan	A coral belonging to the group Favositida and the family Pseudofavositidae.	
Rayaphyllia	Gen. et sp. et comb. nov	Valid	Löser	Cretaceous	San Juan Raya Formation	China? Italy; Mexico	A stony coral belonging to the superfamily Misistelloidea and the family Rayasmiliidae. The type species is R. atheca; genus also includes "Thecosmilia" distefanoi Prever (1909) and possibly also "Montlivaltoides" ngariensis He & Xiao (1990).	
Rayasmilia	Gen. et sp. et comb. nov	Valid	Löser	Late Jurassic to Late Cretaceous (Cenomanian)	San Juan Raya Formation	China; Crimea; France; Italy; Japan; Mexico; Slovakia; Spain; Tanzania; United States	A stony coral belonging to the superfamily Misistelloidea, the type genus of the new family Rayasmiliidae. The type species is R. salvata; genus also includes multiple species formerly assigned to the genera Aulophyllia, Axosmilia, Coelosmilia, Lophosmilia, Peplosmilia, Pleurosmilia, Rhipidosmilia, Saltocyathus, Sphenotrochus and Thecosmilia.	
Semenomalophyllia	Gen. nov	In press	Denayer et al.	Carboniferous (Serpukhovian)		France	A colonial heterocoral. Genus includes S. herbigi, S. perretae, S. weyeri and S. webbi.	
Septuconularia crassiformis	Sp. nov	Valid	Song et al.	Cambrian Stage 2	Yanjiahe Formation	China	A member of the family Hexangulaconulariidae.	
Sonoraphyllia	Gen. et sp. et comb. nov	Valid	Löser	Late Jurassic (Tithonian) to Cretaceous (Albian, possibly also Cenomanian)	Cerro de Oro Formation	China; Czech Republic; Italy? Japan; Mexico; Spain; United States	A stony coral belonging to the superfamily Misistelloidea and the family Rayasmiliidae. The type species is S. aurea; genus also includes "Aplophyllia" marini Bataller (1947), "Aplosmilia" tolmachoffana Wells (1932), "Placophyllia" baingoinensis Wang, Sun, Wang, Zheng, Yue & Liao (2020), "Placophyllia" bandeli Baron-Szabo (1998), "Placophyllia" florosa Eliášová (1976), and "Thecosmilia" hideshimaensis Eguchi (1951).	
Stephanocyathus (Stephanocyathus) taguchii	Sp. nov	Valid	Niko & Suzuki	Miocene	Takakura Formation	Japan	A caryophylloid coral.	
Stylomaeandra neuquensis	Sp. nov	In press	Garberoglio, Löser & Lazo	Early Cretaceous (Valanginian–Hauterivian)	Agrio Formation	Argentina	A stony coral belonging to the family Latomeandridae.	
Syringopora paraconferta	Sp. nov	Valid	Ohar	Carboniferous (Mississippian)		Ukraine	A tabulate coral.	
Thamnopora miyamotoi	Sp. nov	Valid	Niko	Devonian (Givetian)	Naidaijin Formation	Japan	A coral belonging to the group Favositida and the family Pachyporidae.	
Thamnoptychia tanimotoi	Sp. nov	Valid	Niko	Devonian (Givetian)	Naidaijin Formation	Japan	A coral belonging to the group Favositida and the family Pachyporidae.	

=== Cnidarian research ===
- A study on the taphonomy and systematics of conulariid specimens from the Silurian (Telychian) Waukesha Lagerstätte (Wisconsin, United States) is published by Miller et al. (2022).
- Wang et al. (2022) describe phosphatized muscle fibers preserved in three dimensions in post-embryonic stages of olivooids from the Cambrian (Fortunian) Kuanchuanpu Formation (China) – representing the oldest occurrence of muscle tissue in cnidarians, and in animals in general, reported to date – and evaluate the implications of this finding and fossil evidence from ecdysozoans for the knowledge of the evolution of the muscle systems of early animals.
- Zhang et al. (2022) describe the first known soft tissues of Gangtoucunia aspera, and interpret this taxon as a total group medusozoan.
- A study on changes in the functional diversity of tabulate coral assemblages across the Devonian and early Carboniferous, and on their implications for the knowledge of the impact of extinction events from this time period on tabulate corals, is published by Bridge et al. (2022).
- A study on the interactions between conulariid specimens, and attached epibionts from the Silurian (Telychian) Waukesha Lagerstätte (Wisconsin, United States) is published by April et al. (2022).

== Bryozoans ==
=== New named bryozoans ===
Name	Novelty	Status	Authors	Age	Type locality	Location	Notes	Images
Albardonia	Gen. et sp. nov	Valid	Ernst & Carrera	Ordovician (Sandbian)	La Pola Formation	Argentina	A trepostome belonging to the family Heterotrypidae. The type species is A. bifoliata.	
Antropora ramaniaensis	Sp. nov	Valid	Sonar, Pawar & Wayal	Miocene (Burdigalian)	Chhasra Formation	India	A species of Antropora.	
Argentinopora	Gen. et sp. nov	Valid	Ernst & Carrera	Ordovician (Sandbian)	La Pola Formation	Argentina	A trepostome of uncertain affinities. The type species is A. robusta.	
Attinopora atlantica	Sp. nov		López-Gappa & Pérez	Miocene	Monte León Formation	Argentina	A member of the family Cinctiporidae.	
Burdwoodipora griffini	Sp. nov	Valid	Pérez & López-Gappa	Miocene (Burdigalian)	Monte León Formation	Argentina		
Canda ukirensis	Sp. nov	Valid	Sonar, Pawar & Wayal	Miocene (Burdigalian)	Chhasra Formation	India	A species of Canda.	
Chazydictya ornata	Sp. nov	Valid	Ernst & Carrera	Ordovician (Sandbian)	La Pola Formation	Argentina	A cryptostome belonging to the family Escharoporidae.	
Dianulites pakriensis	Sp. nov	Valid	Ernst	Ordovician (Darriwilian)		Estonia	A member of Stenolaemata belonging to the superorder Palaeostomata, the order Esthonioporata and the family Dianulitidae.	
Dyscritella felixi	Sp. nov	Valid	Ernst et al.	Carboniferous (Pennsylvanian)	Graham Formation	United States (Texas)		
Fenestella salairica	Sp. nov	Valid	Mesentseva	Devonian (Emsian)		Russia	A fenestellid bryozoan.	
Hemitrypa aktaschensis	Sp. nov	Valid	Mesentseva	Devonian (Emsian)		Russia	A fenestellid bryozoan.	
Hemitrypa cyathiformis	Sp. nov	Valid	Mesentseva	Devonian (Emsian)		Russia	A fenestellid bryozoan.	
Heterotrypa enodis	Sp. nov	Valid	Ernst & Carrera	Ordovician (Sandbian)	La Pola Formation	Argentina	A trepostome belonging to the family Heterotrypidae.	
Hillmeropora volgogradensis	Sp. nov	Valid	Koromyslova & Pervushov	Late Cretaceous (Turonian)		Russia (Volgograd Oblast)		
Homotrypa cochlea	Sp. nov	Valid	Buttler, Cherns & McCobb	Silurian (Ludlow)	Upper Leintwardine Formation	United Kingdom		
Iodictyum akaishiensis	Sp. nov	Valid	Arakawa	Miocene (Langhian)	Moniwa Formation	Japan	A member of the family Phidoloporidae. Published online in 2022, but the issue date is listed as January 2023.	
Laminoporina	Gen. et sp. nov	Valid	Bizzarini	Late Triassic (Carnian)	San Cassiano Formation	Italy	A member of Stenolaemata belonging to the group Cyclostomida. The type species is L. giampetrii.	
Laxifenestella magnifenestrula	Sp. nov	Valid	Mesentseva	Devonian (Emsian)		Russia	A fenestellid bryozoan.	
Laxifenestella texana	Sp. nov	Valid	Ernst et al.	Carboniferous (Pennsylvanian)	Graham Formation	United States (Texas)		
Micropora mikesmithi	Sp. nov	Valid	Taylor & Villier	Late Cretaceous (Campanian)	Aubeterre Formation	France	A member of the family Microporidae.	
Microporella gladirostra	Sp. nov	Valid	Ramsfjell, Taylor & Di Martino	Miocene (Otaian and Altonian)	White Rock Limestone Formation	New Zealand	A species of Microporella.	
Microporella incurvata	Sp. nov	Valid	Ramsfjell, Taylor & Di Martino	Miocene (Otaian and Altonian)	Clifden Limestone Formation	New Zealand	A species of Microporella.	
Microporella whiterocki	Sp. nov	Valid	Ramsfjell, Taylor & Di Martino	Miocene (Otaian)	White Rock Limestone Formation	New Zealand	A species of Microporella.	
Mishulgella vachardi	Sp. nov	Valid	Ernst, Krainer & Lucas	Carboniferous (Pennsylvanian)		United States (New Mexico)	A trepostome bryozoan.	
Nicholsonella spinigera	Sp. nov	Valid	Ernst & Carrera	Ordovician (Sandbian)	La Pola Formation	Argentina	A trepostome of uncertain affinities.	
Odontoporella miocenica	Sp. nov	Valid	Pérez & López-Gappa	Miocene (Burdigalian)	Monte León Formation	Argentina		
Pakripora	Gen. et sp. nov	Valid	Ernst	Ordovician (Darriwilian)		Estonia	A member of Trepostomata of uncertain phylogenetic placement. The type species is P. cavernosa.	
Pavolunulites mirabilis	Sp. nov	Valid	Koromyslova & Pervushov	Late Cretaceous (Turonian)		Russia (Volgograd Oblast)	A member of Flustrina belonging to the family Lunulitidae.	
Platelinella	Gen. et sp. nov	Valid	Taylor & Villier	Late Cretaceous (Campanian)	Biron Formation	France	A member of the family Microporidae. The type species is P. solea.	
Pollexelea	Gen. et sp. nov	Valid	Taylor	Early Cretaceous (Albian)		India	A cyclostome belonging to the family Eleidae. The type species is P. badvei.	
Primorella zhankurganica	Sp. nov	Valid	Tolokonnikova & Fedorov	Carboniferous (Tournaisian)	Orgalysay Formation	Kazakhstan		
Pseudostictoporella simplex	Sp. nov	Valid	Ernst & Carrera	Ordovician (Sandbian)	La Pola Formation	Argentina	A cryptostome belonging to the family Stictoporellidae.	
Rarifenestella ornamentum	Sp. nov	Valid	Mesentseva	Devonian (Emsian)		Russia	A fenestellid bryozoan.	
Reptomultelea cuffeyi	Sp. nov	Valid	Taylor	Early Cretaceous (Albian)		United States (Texas)	A cyclostome belonging to the family Eleidae.	
Thalamoporella badvei	Sp. nov	Valid	Sonar, Pawar & Wayal	Miocene (Aquitanian)	Kharinadi Formation	India	A species of Thalamoporella.	
Thalamoporella bhujensis	Sp. nov	Valid	Sonar, Pawar & Wayal	Miocene (Aquitanian)	Kharinadi Formation	India	A species of Thalamoporella.	
Xenotrypa argentinensis	Sp. nov	Valid	Ernst & Carrera	Ordovician (Sandbian)	La Pola Formation	Argentina	A cystoporate belonging to the family Xenotrypidae.	

=== Bryozoan research ===
- Fossils which might represent the oldest bryozoans with calcareous skeletons reported to date are described from the Cambrian Harkless Formation (Nevada, United States) by Pruss et al. (2022).
- A study on the impact of paleolatitude on the calcification of cryptostome and trepostome bryozoans through the Paleozoic is published by Reid, Wyse Jackson & Key (2022).
- A study on the diversity of bryozoans from the Ordovician (Tremadocian) Fenhsiang Formation (China) is published by Ma et al. (2022).
- A study on the diversification dynamics of cheilostome bryozoans since the Late Jurassic is published by Moharrek et al. (2022).
- A study on the phylogenetic relationships and evolutionary history of cheilostome bryozoans is published by Orr et al. (2022), who interpret their findings as indicating that named cheilostome genera and species are natural groupings, and that skeletal traits can be used to assign fossil or contemporary specimens to cheilostome species.

== Brachiopods ==
=== Newly named brachiopods ===
Name	Novelty	Status	Authors	Age	Type locality	Location	Notes	Images
Alaskomicospirifer	Gen. et sp. nov	Valid	Baranov & Blodgett	Devonian (Eifelian)		United States (Alaska)	A member of Spiriferida belonging to the superfamily Ambocoelioidea and the family Rhynchospiriferidae. Genus includes new species A. boreus.	
Allorhynchus scientiana	Sp. nov	Valid	Torres-Martínez & Sour-Tovar	Carboniferous (Serpukhovian)	Ixtaltepec Formation	Mexico	A member of Rhynchonellida belonging to the superfamily Wellerelloidea and the family Allorhynchidae.	
Altynorthis	Gen. et 2 sp. et comb. nov	In press	Popov & Cocks	Ordovician	Berkutsyur Formation	Kazakhstan	A member of the family Plectorthidae. The type species is A. vinogradovae; genus also includes new species A. betpakdalensis, as well as "Hesperorthis" tabylgatensis Misius (1986).	
Anchorhynchia multicostata	Sp. nov	Valid	Viaretti et al.	Permian (Kungurian)	Batain Group	Oman	A member of Rhynchonellida belonging to the family Wellerellidae.	
Andronovia	Gen. et sp. nov	Valid	Baranov & Blodgett	Devonian (Emsian)		Russia	A member of Pentamerida belonging to the group Pentameridina and the family Gypidulidae. The type species is A. geremgandzhensis.	
Anemonaria kitakamiense	Sp. nov	Valid	Tazawa in Tazawa & Shintani	Permian (Sakmarian–Kungurian)		Japan	A member of Productida belonging to the family Paucispiniferidae.	
Anthracospirifer oaxacaensis	Sp. nov	Valid	Torres-Martínez & Sour-Tovar	Carboniferous (Moscovian)	Ixtaltepec Formation	Mexico	A member of Spiriferida belonging to the superfamily Spiriferoidea and the family Spiriferidae.	
Apatomorpha akbakaiensis	Sp. nov	In press	Popov & Cocks	Ordovician	Baigara Formation	Kazakhstan		
Aperispirifer demulceatus	Sp. nov	Valid	Waterhouse	Permian		Australia	A member of the family Trigonotretidae.	
Aploobolus	Gen. et sp. nov	In press	Popov & Cocks	Ordovician (Sandbian)	Kopkurgan Formation	Kazakhstan	A member of the family Obolidae. The type species is A. tenuis.	
Apousiella belliloci aramaris	Ssp. nov	In press	García-Alcalde	Devonian (Frasnian)	Piñeres Formation	Spain	A member of Spiriferida belonging to the family Mucrospiriferidae.	
Apousiella dorlodoti peranensis	Ssp. nov	In press	García-Alcalde	Devonian (Givetian)	Candás Formation	Spain	A member of Spiriferida belonging to the family Mucrospiriferidae.	
Apousiella mozarti	Sp. nov	In press	García-Alcalde	Devonian (Givetian or Frasnian)	Candás Formation	Spain	A member of Spiriferida belonging to the family Mucrospiriferidae.	
Aramazdospirifer	Gen. et comb. nov	Valid	Serobyan et al.	Devonian (Famennian)		Armenia	A member of the family Cyrtospiriferidae. The type species is "Spirifer" orbelianus Abich (1858).	
Araxathyris minor	Sp. nov	Valid	Wu et al.	Permian (Wuchiapingian)	Shuizhutang Formation	China		
Arzonellina bogicae	Sp. nov	In press	Vörös	Early Jurassic (Sinemurian?)	Brachiopodal Hierlatz Limestone	Hungary	A member of Terebratulida belonging to the family Arzonellinidae.	
Baeorhynchia begini	Sp. nov	Valid	Feldman, Blodgett & Wilson	Middle Jurassic (Callovian)	Matmor Formation	Israel	A member of Rhynchonellida.	
Baitalorhyncha	Gen. et sp. nov	In press	Popov & Cocks	Ordovician		Kazakhstan	A member of the family Sphenotretidae. The type species is B. rectimarginata.	
Batenevotreta? mexicana	Sp. nov	Valid	Holmer et al.	Cambrian (Wuliuan)	El Gavilán Formation	Mexico	A member of Acrotretida, possibly a member of the family Scaphelasmatidae.	
Bimuria karatalensis	Sp. nov	In press	Popov & Cocks	Ordovician		Kazakhstan	A member of the family Bimuriidae.	
Brachiobittnerella	Nom. nov		Ceccolini & Cianferoni	Triassic		Hungary; Tajikistan	A member of Thecideida belonging to the family Thecospirellidae; a replacement name for Bittnerella Dagys (1974).	
Brachiokasakhstania	Nom. nov		Ceccolini & Cianferoni	Permian		Canada	A member of Spiriferida belonging to the family Spiriferidae; a replacement name for Kasakhstania Besnossova (1968).	
Brachiosvalbardia	Nom. nov		Ceccolini & Cianferoni	Late Paleozoic		Australia; Greenland; Norway; Russia	A member of Productida belonging to the family Rugosochonetidae; a replacement name for Svalbardia Barkhatova (1970).	
Brachiotesuquea	Nom. nov		Ceccolini & Cianferoni	Carboniferous		United States (New Mexico)	A member of Productida belonging to the family Productidae; a replacement name for Tesuquea Sutherland & Harlow (1973).	
Calloria? hilleri	Sp. nov	Valid	Cooper	Miocene	Monzi Formation	South Africa	Possibly a species of Calloria.	
Callytharrella websteri	Sp. nov	Valid	Viaretti et al.	Permian (Kungurian)	Batain Group	Oman	A member of Productida belonging to the family Productidae.	
Cheeneetnukispirifer	Gen. et sp. nov	Valid	Baranov & Blodgett	Devonian (Eifelian)		United States (Alaska)	A member of Spiriferida belonging to the superfamily Ambocoelioidea and the family Ambocoeliidae. Genus includes new species C. rarus.	
Cirpa lucentina	Sp. nov	Valid	Baeza-Carratalá & García Joral	Early Jurassic (Pliensbachian)	Gavilán Formation	Spain	A member of Rhynchonellida belonging to the family Wellerellidae.	
Cleiothyridina elevata	Sp. nov	Valid	Waterhouse	Permian		Australia		
Clorinda cappsi	Sp. nov	Valid	Blodgett, Baranov & Santucci	Devonian (Emsian)	Shellabarger Limestone	United States (Alaska)	A member of Pentamerida belonging to the group Pentameridina and the family Clorindidae.	
Costirhynchopsis xui	Sp. nov	Valid	Guo et al.	Middle Triassic (Anisian)		China		
Costistriispira	Gen. et sp. nov	In press	Popov & Cocks	Ordovician (Sandbian)	Kopkurgan Formation	Kazakhstan	A member of Lissatrypoidea belonging to the family Kellerellidae. The type species is C. proavia.	
Crenulatomargus	Gen. et sp. nov	Valid	Guo et al.	Middle Triassic (Anisian)		China	Genus includes new species C. terebratuliformis.	
Cuninulus eulenbergensis	Sp. nov	Valid	Wenndorf	Devonian		Germany	A member of Rhynchonellida belonging to the family Nucinulidae.	
Cuninulus filiplicatus	Sp. nov	Valid	Wenndorf	Devonian (Emsian)		Germany	A member of Rhynchonellida belonging to the family Nucinulidae.	
Cuninulus trostiensis	Sp. nov	Valid	Wenndorf	Devonian		Germany	A member of Rhynchonellida belonging to the family Nucinulidae.	
Cuninulus vitelliacensis	Sp. nov	Valid	Wenndorf	Devonian (Emsian)		Germany	A member of Rhynchonellida belonging to the family Nucinulidae.	
Dyscoliope	Gen. et sp. nov	Valid	Vörös	Jurassic - Cretaceous		Hungary	A member of Terebratulida belonging to the family Pygopidae. The type species is D. guttula.	
Doughlatomena	Gen. et sp. nov	In press	Popov & Cocks	Ordovician		Kazakhstan	A member of the family Rafinesquinidae. The type species is D. splendens.	
Eiratrypa	Gen. et comb. nov	Unavailable	Baarli	Silurian (Aeronian and Telychian)		Norway; Russia; Sweden; United Kingdom	A member of the family Atrypidae. The type species is "Protatrypa" thorslundi Boucot & Johnson (1964); genus also includes "Atrypa" orbicularis Sowerby (1839) and "Atrypa" antiqua Kulkov in Kulkov & Severgina (1989). The name is not unavailable as the e-publication lacks proof of registration in ZooBank.	
Eoanastrophia tozodoviensis	Sp. nov	Valid	Shcherbanenko & Sennikov	Late Ordovician		Russia	A member of Pentamerida.	
Eodmitria briceae	Sp. nov	In press	García-Alcalde	Devonian (Givetian or Frasnian)	Candás Formation	Spain	A member of Spiriferida belonging to the family Cyrtospiriferidae.	
Eucalathis davidi	Sp. nov	Valid	Dulai	Pliocene		Italy	A species of Eucalathis.	
Eucalathis dorae	Sp. nov	Valid	Dulai	Pliocene		Italy	A species of Eucalathis.	
Fuchsinulus	Gen. et comb. sp. nov	Valid	Wenndorf	Devonian		Germany	A member of Rhynchonellida belonging to the family Nucinulidae. Genus includes F. mediorhenanus (Fuchs, 1912) and F. furcaradiatus (Dahmer, 1923), as well as new species F. lahnsteinensis.	
Geothomasia delicatula	Sp. nov	Valid	Waterhouse	Permian		Australia	A member of Spiriferida belonging to the family Ingelarellidae.	
Glosseudesia inexpectata	Sp. nov		Mojon in Mojon & De Kaenel	Early Cretaceous (Barremian)	Saars Formation	Switzerland		
Hirnantia notiskuani	Sp. nov	Valid	Zimmt & Jin	Ordovician (Hirnantian)	Ellis Bay Formation	Canada (Quebec)	A member of Enteletoidea belonging to the family Draboviidae.	
Ingelarella canalis	Sp. nov	Valid	Waterhouse	Permian	Barfield Formation	Australia	A member of Spiriferida belonging to the family Ingelarellidae.	
Isbellina	Gen. et comb. nov	Valid	Waterhouse	Permian		Australia	A member of Strophomenata belonging to the superfamily Orthotetoidea and the family Schuchertellidae. The type species is "Streptorhynchus" pelicanensis Fletcher (1952).	
Ivdelinia (Ivdelinia) tweeti	Sp. nov	Valid	Blodgett, Baranov & Santucci	Devonian (Emsian)	Shellabarger Limestone	United States (Alaska)	A member of Pentamerida belonging to the group Pentameridina and the family Gypidulidae.	
Jakutoproductus japonicus	Sp. nov	Valid	Tazawa in Tazawa & Shintani	Permian (Sakmarian)		Japan	A member of Productida belonging to the family Avoniidae.	
Kallirhynchia radulovici	Sp. nov	Valid	Feldman, Blodgett & Wilson	Middle Jurassic (Callovian)	Matmor Formation	Israel	A member of Rhynchonellida.	
Kassinella simorini	Sp. nov	In press	Popov & Cocks	Ordovician	Kopkurgan Formation	Kazakhstan		
Lahninulus	Gen. et 3 sp. nov	Valid	Wenndorf	Devonian		Germany	A member of Rhynchonellida belonging to the family Nucinulidae. Genus includes new species L. emsensis, L. flabelliplicatus and L. steinmeyeri.	
Lapinulus eichelei	Sp. nov	Valid	Wenndorf	Devonian (Emsian)		Germany	A member of Rhynchonellida belonging to the family Nucinulidae.	
Lapinulus frankei	Sp. nov	Valid	Wenndorf	Devonian		Germany	A member of Rhynchonellida belonging to the family Nucinulidae.	
Lapinulus haigerensis	Sp. nov	Valid	Wenndorf	Devonian (Emsian)		Germany	A member of Rhynchonellida belonging to the family Nucinulidae.	
Lapinulus? leudersdorfensis	Sp. nov	Valid	Wenndorf	Devonian		Germany	A member of Rhynchonellida belonging to the family Nucinulidae.	
Lapinulus? molliformis	Sp. nov	Valid	Wenndorf	Devonian		Germany	A member of Rhynchonellida belonging to the family Nucinulidae.	
Lapinulus pila luxemburgensis	Ssp. nov	Valid	Wenndorf	Devonian (Emsian)		Germany	A member of Rhynchonellida belonging to the family Nucinulidae.	
Lapinulus pila taunusiensis	Ssp. nov	Valid	Wenndorf	Devonian (Emsian)		Germany	A member of Rhynchonellida belonging to the family Nucinulidae.	
Leiorhynchoidea perrilliatae	Sp. nov	Valid	Torres-Martínez & Sour-Tovar	Carboniferous (Moscovian)	Ixtaltepec Formation	Mexico	A member of Rhynchonellida belonging to the superfamily Pugnacoidea and the family Petasmariidae.	
Lepidomena betpakdalensis	Sp. nov	In press	Popov & Cocks	Ordovician	Baigara Formation	Kazakhstan		
Lepismatina? inusitata	Sp. nov	Valid	Guo et al.	Middle Triassic (Anisian)		China		
Lictorthis	Gen. et comb. nov	In press	Popov & Cocks	Ordovician		Kazakhstan	A member of the family Plectorthidae. The type species is "Plectorthis" licta Popov & Cocks (2006).	
Linoproductus huananensis	Sp. nov	Valid	Wu et al.	Permian (Wuchiapingian)	Shuizhutang Formation	China		
Lydirhyncha	Gen. et comb. nov	In press	Popov & Cocks	Ordovician		China; Kazakhstan	A member of the family Ancistrorhynchidae. The type species is "Rhynchotrema" zhejiangensis Wang in Wang & Jin (1964); genus also includes "Rhynchotrema" gushanensis Liang in Liu et al. (1983) and "Rhynchotrema" tarimensis Sproat & Zhan (2018).	
Maorielasma deflata	Sp. nov	Valid	Waterhouse	Permian	Mantuan Formation	Australia	A member of Spiriferinida belonging to the superfamily Pennospiriferinoidea and the family Reticulariinidae.	
Megerlina lesterkingi	Sp. nov	Valid	Cooper	Miocene	Monzi Formation	South Africa	A species of Megerlina.	
Micopisticospirifer	Gen. et sp. nov	Valid	Baranov & Blodgett	Devonian (Eifelian)		United States (Alaska)	A member of Spiriferida belonging to the superfamily Ambocoelioidea and the family Ambocoeliidae. Genus includes new species M. simplex.	
Nonauria	Gen. et comb. et sp. nov	Valid	Waterhouse	Permian	Barfield Formation	Australia	A member of Productida belonging to the superfamily Strophalosioidea and the family Dasyalosiidae. The type species is "Acanthalosia" parfreyi Waterhouse (2001); genus also includes new species N. commarginalis.	
Pentagonospirifer	Gen. et sp. nov	Valid	Serobyan et al.	Devonian (Famennian)		Armenia	A cyrtospiriferid brachiopod. The type species is P. abrahamyanae.	
Permasyrinx mundanus	Sp. nov	Valid	Waterhouse	Permian		Australia	A member of Spiriferinida belonging to the family Syringothyridae.	
Permophricodothyris flata	Sp. nov	Valid	Wu et al.	Permian (Wuchiapingian)	Shuizhutang Formation	China		
Phaceloorthis? corrugata	Sp. nov	In press	Popov & Cocks	Ordovician		Kazakhstan		
Piarorhynchella selongensis	Sp. nov	Valid	Wang & Chen in Wang et al.	Early Triassic		China		
Proconchidium schleyi	Sp. nov	Valid	Jin et al.	Late Ordovician		Greenland		
Prodavidsonia ebbighauseni	Sp. nov	Valid	Halamski & Baliński in Halamski, Baliński & Koppka	Devonian (Eifelian)	Taboumakhlouf Formation	Morocco	A member of the family Davidsoniidae.	
Pseudostrophalosia furcalina	Sp. nov	Valid	Waterhouse	Permian		Australia	A member of Productida belonging to the superfamily Strophalosioidea and the family Dasyalosiidae.	
Pseudostrophalosia routi cryptica	Ssp. nov	Valid	Waterhouse	Permian	Blenheim Formation	Australia	A member of Productida belonging to the superfamily Strophalosioidea and the family Dasyalosiidae.	
Qilianoconcha circularis	Sp. nov	Valid	Guo et al.	Middle Triassic (Anisian)		China		
Retimarginifera auriculata	Sp. nov	Valid	Viaretti et al.	Permian (Kungurian)	Batain Group	Oman	A member of Productida belonging to the family Productellidae.	
Rhynchogilviella	Nom. nov		Ceccolini & Cianferoni	Devonian		Australia; Canada; Russia	A member of Rhynchonellata belonging to the group Atrypida and the family Atrypinidae; a replacement name for Ogilviella Lenz (1968).	
Rhyncholeptospira	Nom. nov		Ceccolini & Cianferoni	Devonian		United States (New York)	A member of Athyridida belonging to the family Rhynchospirinidae; a replacement name for Leptospira Boucot, Johnson & Staton (1964).	
Schwagerispira cheni	Sp. nov	Valid	Wang & Chen in Wang et al.	Early Triassic		China		
Schwagerispira elegans	Sp. nov	Valid	Guo et al.	Middle Triassic (Anisian)		China		
Selongthyris	Gen. et sp. nov	Valid	Wang & Chen in Wang et al.	Early Triassic		China	Genus includes new species S. plana.	
Sonculina baigarensis	Sp. nov	In press	Popov & Cocks	Ordovician		Kazakhstan		
Sphriganaria anyamiae	Sp. nov		Feldman, Radulović & Ahmad	Middle Jurassic (Callovian)	Mughanniyya Formation	Jordan		
Spinatrypa ennigaldinannae	Sp. nov	Valid	Halamski & Baliński in Halamski, Baliński & Koppka	Devonian (Eifelian)	Taboumakhlouf Formation	Morocco	A member of the family Atrypidae.	
Spiriarchboldiella	Nom. nov		Ceccolini & Cianferoni	Permian		Indonesia	A member of Spiriferida belonging to the family Spiriferellidae; a replacement name for Archboldiella Winkler Prins (2008).	
Spiriferella posterosulcata	Sp. nov	Valid	Viaretti et al.	Permian (Kungurian-Roadian)	Batain Group	Oman	A member of Spiriferida belonging to the family Spiriferellidae.	
Stenoscisma qararensis	Sp. nov	Valid	Viaretti et al.	Permian (Kungurian-Roadian)	Batain Group	Oman	A member of Rhynchonellida belonging to the family Stenoscismatidae.	
Sulcicosta lata	Sp. nov	Valid	Waterhouse	Permian		Australia	A member of Spiriferinida belonging to the family Syringothyridae.	
Tcherskidium lonei	Sp. nov	Valid	Jin et al.	Late Ordovician		United States (Alaska)		
Tenticospirifer? sinuosus	Sp. nov	In press	García-Alcalde	Devonian (Frasnian)	Piñeres Formation	Spain	A member of Spiriferida belonging to the family Cyrtospiriferidae.	
Terebratulina savagei	Sp. nov	Valid	Cooper	Miocene	Monzi Formation	South Africa	A species of Terebratulina.	
Terrakea elongata planidisca	Ssp. nov	Valid	Waterhouse	Permian		Australia	A member of Productida belonging to the superfamily Proboscidelloidea and the family Paucispinauriidae.	
Terrakea macrospina	Sp. nov	Valid	Waterhouse	Permian	Mantuan Formation	Australia	A member of Productida belonging to the superfamily Proboscidelloidea and the family Paucispinauriidae.	
Testaprica alperovichi	Sp. nov	In press	Popov & Cocks	Ordovician		Kazakhstan		
Thecidanella	Nom. nov		Ceccolini & Cianferoni	Late Cretaceous		France	A member of Thecideida belonging to the family Thecideidae; a replacement name for Danella Pajaud (1966).	
Tianjunospina	Gen. et sp. nov	Valid	Guo et al.	Middle Triassic (Anisian)		China	Genus includes new species T. junheensis.	
Tornatospirifer	Gen. et comb. nov	Valid	Serobyan et al.	Devonian (Famennian)		Armenia	A cyrtospiriferid brachiopod. The type species is T. armenicus.	
Tyloplecta liannanensis	Sp. nov	Valid	Wu et al.	Permian (Wuchiapingian)	Shuizhutang Formation	China		
Waagenoconcha peregoedovi	Sp. nov	Valid	Makoshin	Early Permian	Kubalakh Formation	Russia	A member of Productida.	

=== Brachiopod research ===
- Redescription and a study on the phylogenetic affinities of Diandongia pista is published by Wang et al. (2022).
- A study on the phylogenetic relationships of the Ordovician and Silurian members of Atrypida is published by Baarli, Huang & Maroja (2022).
- A study on the phylogenetic relationships and biogeography of members of the family Nisusiidae is published by Oh et al. (2022).
- Evidence indicating that microstructure, maximum thickness and shell spiral characterization can aid taxonomic identification of gigantoproductid brachiopods is published by Mateos-Carralafuente et al. (2022).
- Description of remains of the rhynchonellid Erymnaria from the early Ypresian-aged Chruteren Member of the Euthal Formation, Switzerland, representing the first known occurrence of the genus in the Chruteren Member, is published by Sulser et al. (2022).

== Echinoderms ==
=== Newly named echinoderms ===
Name	Novelty	Status	Authors	Age	Type locality	Location	Notes	Images
Acriaster aresensis	Sp. nov	Valid	Forner in Forner et al.	Early Cretaceous (Barremian)	Artoles Formation	Spain	A sea urchin belonging to the group Cassiduloida and the family Archiaciidae.	
Aliopsis	Gen. et comb. nov		Abdelhamid, Abdelghany & Abu Saima	Late Cretaceous (Maastrichtian)		United Arab Emirates/Oman border region	A sea urchin belonging to the group Arbacioida and the family Acropeltidae. The type species is "Glyphopneustes" hattaensis Ali (1992).	
Angulocrinus tomaszi	Sp. nov	Valid	Zamora	Late Jurassic (Oxfordian)	Yatova Formation	Spain	A crinoid belonging to the group Millericrinida and the family Millericrinidae.	
Anticostiechinus	Gen. et sp. nov	Valid	Thompson, Ausich & Cournoyer	Silurian		Canada (Quebec)	A sea urchin belonging to the family Echinocystitidae. Genus includes new species A. petryki.	
Arauricystis clariondi	Sp. nov	In press	Lefebvre et al.	Ordovician	Izegguirene Formation	Czech Republic; Morocco	A cornute stylophoran belonging to the family Cothurnocystidae.	
Astroblastocystis	Nom. nov		Sałamatin & Kaczmarek	Ordovician		Russia	A replacement name for Blastocystis Jaekel (1918).	
Atelestocrinus baumilleri	Sp. nov	Valid	Gahn	Carboniferous (Viséan)	Ramp Creek Formation	United States (Indiana)	A cladid crinoid belonging to the group Dendrocrinida.	
Ausichicrinites	Gen. et sp. nov	Valid	Salamon et al.	Late Jurassic (Tithonian)	Antalo Limestone	Ethiopia	A member of Comatulida. The type species is A. zelenskyyi.	
Bohemiaecystis chouberti	Sp. nov	In press	Lefebvre et al.	Ordovician		Morocco	A cornute stylophoran.	
Catopygus vilari	Sp. nov	Valid	Forner	Early Cretaceous (Aptian)	Forcall Formation	Spain	A sea urchin belonging to the group Cassiduloida.	
Chiampocrinus	Gen. et 2 sp. nov	Valid	Manni	Eocene		Italy	A crinoid belonging to the group Articulata. The type species is C. lobatus; genus also includes C. conicus.	
Clypeaster surarui	Nom. nov	Valid	Carrasco & Trif	Eocene		Romania	A species of Clypeaster; a replacement name for Clypeaster (Palaeanthus) transsylvanicus Șuraru, Gábos & Șuraru (1967).	
Codiacrinus sevastopuloi	Sp. nov	Valid	Ausich et al.	Devonian (Emsian)		Poland	A cyathoform cladid crinoid.	
Cyclaster jamiei	Sp. nov	Valid	McNamara & Martin	Eocene	Manypeaks limestone	Australia	A sea urchin belonging to the group Spatangoida and the family Micrasteridae.	
Destombesicarpus	Gen. et 2 sp. nov	In press	Lefebvre et al.	Ordovician		Czech Republic; Morocco	A cornute stylophoran belonging to the family Chauvelicystidae. Genus includes new species D. izegguirenensis and D. budili.	
Diamphidiocystis regnaulti	Sp. nov	In press	Lefebvre et al.	Ordovician		Czech Republic; France; Morocco	An anomalocystitid mitrate.	
Eurhodia westaustraliae	Sp. nov	Valid	McNamara & Martin	Eocene	Nanarup limestone	Australia	A species of Eurhodia.	
Exallocrinus	Gen. et sp. nov	In press	Webster, Heward & Ausich	Permian (Wordian)	Khuff Formation	Oman	A crinoid, possibly a member of the family Ampelocrinidae. The type species is E. khuffensis.	
Fabianicrinus	Gen. et sp. et comb. nov	Valid	Manni	Eocene		Crimea; France; Italy	A crinoid belonging to the group Articulata. The type species is F. fusus; genus also includes F. cazioti (Valette, 1924), F. duperrieri (Roux, 1978) and F. vogdti (Weber, 1949).	
Fossulaster susae	Sp. nov	Valid	McNamara & Martin	Eocene	Nanarup limestone	Australia	A sand dollar belonging to the family Fossulasteridae.	
Furculaster	Gen. et sp. nov	In press	Gale	Late Cretaceous		Europe	A starfish belonging to the family Korethrasteridae. Genus includes new species F. cretae.	
Gillechinus kaitae	Sp. nov	Valid	McNamara & Martin	Eocene	Manypeaks limestone	Australia	A sea urchin belonging to the group Spatangoida and the family Maretiidae.	
Habanaster itzae	Sp. nov	In press	Villier et al.	Eocene (Lutetian)	Anotz Formation	Spain	A heart urchin belonging to the family Ovulasteridae.	
Kutscheraster	Gen. et sp. nov	In press	Gale	Late Cretaceous (Maastrichtian)		Germany	A starfish belonging to the group Velatida. Genus includes new species K. ruegenensis.	
Lessinicrinus	Gen. et comb. et sp. nov	Valid	Manni	Eocene		France; Italy; Switzerland	A crinoid belonging to the family Rhizocrinidae. The type species is "Conocrinus" suessi de Loriol (1879); genus also includes "Pseudoconocrinus" lavadensis Roux, Martinez & Vizcaïno (2021), as well as new species L. minutus.	
Milonicystis reboulorum	Sp. nov	In press	Lefebvre et al.	Ordovician		Morocco	A cornute stylophoran.	
Muldaster	Gen. et sp. nov	Valid	Thuy, Eriksson & Numberger-Thuy in Thuy et al.	Silurian (Wenlock)	Halla Formation	Sweden	A brittle star. The type species is M. haakei.	
Neobothriocidaris pentlandensis	Sp. nov	Valid	Thompson et al.	Silurian		Sweden; United Kingdom	A sea urchin.	
Ohiocrinus byeongseoni	Sp. nov	Valid	Park et al.	Ordovician (Darriwilian)	Jigunsan Formation	South Korea	A cincinnaticrinid crinoid.	
Ophiobartia	Gen. et sp. nov	Valid	Loba in Loba & Radwańska	Late Jurassic (Kimmeridgian)		Poland	A brittle star belonging to the group Ophiacanthida. The type species is O. radwanskii.	
Ophiodoris niersteinensis	Sp. nov	Valid	Thuy, Nungesser & Numberger-Thuy	Oligocene (Rupelian)	Bodenheim Formation	Germany	A brittle star belonging to the family Ophionereididae.	
Ophiopetagno	Gen. et sp. nov	Valid	Thuy, Eriksson & Numberger-Thuy in Thuy et al.	Silurian (Wenlock)	Fröjel Formation	Sweden	A brittle star. The type species is O. paicei.	
Ophiura pohangensis	Sp. nov	Valid	Ishida et al.	Miocene	Duho Formation	South Korea	A species of Ophiura.	
Ophiura tankardi	Sp. nov	Valid	Thuy, Nungesser & Numberger-Thuy	Oligocene (Rupelian)	Bodenheim Formation	Germany	A species of Ophiura.	
Oretanocalix julioi	Sp. nov	In press	Paul & Gutiérrez-Marcos	Ordovician (Darriwilian)	Navas de Estena Formation	Spain	A member of Diploporita belonging to the family Aristocystitidae.	
Orthopsis kiseljaki	Sp. nov	Valid	Stecher	Late Triassic (Rhaetian)	Kössen Formation	Austria	A sea urchin belonging to the group Carinacea and the family Orthopsidae.	
Parahybocrinus	Gen. et sp. nov	Valid	Guensburg & Sprinkle	Ordovician (Floian)	Fillmore Formation	United States (Utah)	A cladid crinoid belonging to the group Hybocrinida. The type species is P. siewersi.	
Peedeeaster	Gen. et sp. nov	Valid	Mah	Late Cretaceous (Maastrichtian)	Peedee Formation	United States (North Carolina)	A starfish belonging to the family Goniasteridae. The type species is P. sandersoni.	
Pteraster angulatus	Sp. nov	In press	Gale	Late Cretaceous		Europe	A starfish, a species of Pteraster.	
Pteraster balticus	Sp. nov	In press	Gale	Late Cretaceous (Maastrichtian)		Germany	A starfish, a species of Pteraster.	
Pteraster cretachiton	Sp. nov	In press	Gale	Late Cretaceous		Europe	A starfish, a species of Pteraster.	
Pteraster kutscheri	Sp. nov	In press	Gale	Late Cretaceous (Campanian and Maastrichtian)		Germany; United Kingdom	A starfish, a species of Pteraster.	
Pteraster lyddenensis	Sp. nov	Valid	Gale	Late Cretaceous (Cenomanian)	Grey Chalk Subgroup of the Chalk Group	United Kingdom	A starfish, a species of Pteraster. Published online in 2022, but the issue date is listed as February 2023.	
Pteraster nudus	Sp. nov	In press	Gale	Late Cretaceous		United Kingdom	A starfish, a species of Pteraster.	
Pteraster paucispinus	Sp. nov	In press	Gale	Late Cretaceous (Maastichtian)		Germany	A starfish, a species of Pteraster.	
Pteraster seafordensis	Sp. nov	In press	Gale	Late Cretaceous (Coniacian–Santonian)		United Kingdom	A starfish, a species of Pteraster.	
Pteraster turoniense	Sp. nov	In press	Gale	Late Cretaceous (Turonian)	Bridgwick Marl	France; United Kingdom	A starfish, a species of Pteraster.	
Sprinkleoglobus	Gen. et sp. et comb. nov	Valid	Zhao et al.	Cambrian	Maotianshan Shale Member of the Yu'anshan Formation	China; United States (Utah)	A member of Edrioasteroidea, possibly belonging to Edrioasterida. The type species is S. extenuatus; genus also includes "Totiglobus" lloydi Sprinkle (1985).	
Syndiasmocrinus	Gen. et sp. nov	Valid	Guensburg & Sprinkle	Ordovician (Floian)	Ninemile Formation	United States (Nevada; Utah)	A cladid crinoid belonging to the group Hybocrinida. The type species is S. apokalypto.	
Thoralicarpus	Gen. et 2 sp. et comb. nov	In press	Lefebvre et al.	Ordovician		Czech Republic; France; Morocco; Spain	A cornute stylophoran belonging to the family Scotiaecystidae. Genus includes new species T. bounemrouensis and T. prokopi, as well as "Bohemiaecystis" jefferiesi Gil Cid et al. (1996) and "Scotiaecystis" guilloui Lefebvre & Vizcaïno (1999).	
Triadoleucella	Gen. et sp. nov		Ishida et al.	Late Triassic (Carnian)		Vietnam	A brittle star belonging to the group Ophioleucida. Genus includes new species T. meensis. Published online in 2022, but the issue date is listed as April 2023.	
Yorkicystis	Gen. et sp. nov		Zamora et al.	Cambrian	Kinzers Formation	United States (Pennsylvania)	An edrioasteroid. The type species is Y. haefneri.	
Zygocycloides? foerstei	Sp. nov	Valid	Ausich & Zehler	Silurian (Aeronian)	Brassfield Formation	United States (Ohio)	A member of Cyclocystoidea belonging to the family Cyclocystoididae.	

=== Echinoderm research ===
- A study on the evolution of the anatomy and life habits of Cambrian–Ordovician echinoderms is published by Novack-Gottshall et al. (2022).
- A study on the morphology of the internal bars in Lagynocystis pyramidalis and Jaekelocarpus oklahomensis, reevaluating the evidence for gill bars in stylophorans, is published by Álvarez-Armada et al. (2022).
- A study on dispersal patterns and morphological changes in sphaeronitid diploporans across the Ordovician–Silurian boundary is published by Sheffield et al. (2022).
- A study on the morphology and paleoecology of calceocrinid crinoids is published by Ausich (2022).
- A study on the phylogeny and divergence times of major lineages of sea urchins, comparing phylogenomic data with the fossil record, is published by Mongiardino Koch et al. (2022).
- Redescription of Cantabrigiaster fezouataensis is published by Blake & Hotchkiss (2022), who synonymize the genus Cantabrigiaster with the chinianasterid somasteroid genus Villebrunaster, and consider the interpretations of a close phylogenetic linkage between crinoids and starfish and an edrioasteroid ancestry of starfish to be inadequately supported.

== Hemichordates ==
Name	Novelty	Status	Authors	Age	Type locality	Location	Notes	Images
Acrograptus(?) artus	Sp. nov		Maletz	Ordovician (Floian)		Sweden	A graptolite.	
Anjigraptus	Gen. et sp. nov	Valid	Muir et al.	Ordovician (Hirnantian)		China	A graptolite. The type species is A. wangi.	

=== Hemichordate research ===
- The putative alga Krejciella is reinterpreted as an acorn worm tube by Fatka & Vodička (2022).

== Conodonts ==
=== New taxa ===
Name	Novelty	Status	Authors	Age	Type locality	Location	Notes	Images
Amorphognathus viirae	Sp. nov		Paiste, Männik & Meidla	Ordovician (Sandbian)		Estonia; Poland? Sweden; United States?		
Belodella salairica	Sp. nov	Valid	Izokh	Devonian		Russia		
Caudicriodus yolkini	Sp. nov	Valid	Izokh	Devonian		Russia		
Condorodus	Gen. et 3 sp. nov	Valid	Carlorosi, Mestre & Heredia	Ordovician	San Juan Formation	Argentina	The type species is C. chilcaensis; genus also includes C. diablensis and C. gracielae.	
Discretella pseudodieneri	Sp. nov		Leu & Goudemand in Leu et al.	Early Triassic	Luolou Formation	China; Japan	A member of the family Gondolellidae belonging to the subfamily Mullerinae.	
Heckelina	Gen. et comb. nov		Barrick, Hogancamp & Rosscoe	Carboniferous (Pennsylvanian)		China; Russia; Ukraine; United States	Genus includes "Streptognathodus" simulator Ellison (1941), "Streptognathodus" praenuntius Chernykh (2005), "Streptognathodus" auritus Chernykh (2005), "Idiognathodus" eudoraensis Barrick, Heckel & Boardman (2008), "Idiognathodus" lateralis Hogancamp, Barrick & Straussand (2016) and "Idiognathodus" abdivitus Hogancamp & Barrick (2018).	
Icriodus olgaborisovnae	Sp. nov	Valid	Nazarova & Kononova	Devonian (Eifelian)		Russia		
Idiognathodus praeguizhouensis	Sp. nov	Valid	Hu, Qi & Wang	Carboniferous (Pennsylvanian)		China		
Juanognathus? denticulatus	Sp. nov	Valid	Zhen, Allen & Martin	Early Ordovician	Nambeet Formation	Australia		
Neospathodus bevelledi	Sp. nov	Disputed	Leu & Goudemand in Leu et al.	Early Triassic	Luolou Formation	China; Japan; Oman; Vietnam	A member of the family Gondolellidae belonging to the subfamily Neogondolellinae. Argued to be a junior synonym of Neospathodus yangtzeensis by Wu et al. (2023); on the other hand, Leu (2024) argued that N. bevelledi is a senior synonym of N. yangtzeensis.	
Novispathodus gryphus	Sp. nov		Leu & Goudemand in Leu et al.	Early Triassic	Luolou Formation	China	A member of the family Gondolellidae belonging to the subfamily Novispathodinae.	
Novispathodus praebrevissimus	Sp. nov		Leu & Goudemand in Leu et al.	Early Triassic	Luolou Formation	China; Norway; Oman	A member of the family Gondolellidae belonging to the subfamily Novispathodinae.	
Palmatolepis adorfensis	Sp. nov	Valid	Saupe & Becker	Devonian (Frasnian)		Australia; Belgium; Germany; Morocco		
Palmatolepis descendens	Sp. nov	Valid	Saupe & Becker	Devonian (Frasnian)		China; Germany		
Palmatolepis jamieae rosa	Ssp. nov	Valid	Saupe & Becker	Devonian (Frasnian)		Belgium; China; Germany; Russia		
Palmatolepis jamieae savagei	Ssp. nov	Valid	Saupe & Becker	Devonian (Frasnian)		China; Germany; Morocco; Russia		
Protognathodus semikockeli	Sp. nov	Valid	Hartenfels et al.	Devonian-Carboniferous transition		Algeria; Austria; Belgium; China; Czech Republic? France; Germany; Iran; Italy; Poland; Russia; Spain; United Kingdom? United States		
Siphonodella vladimirovi	Nom. nov	Valid	Plotitsyn	Early Carboniferous		Russia; Tajikistan	A member of the family Elictognathidae; a replacement name for Siphonodella diagonalica Pazukhin (1989).	
Urdyella	Gen. et. 2 sp. nov	Unavailable	Leu & Goudemand in Leu et al.	Early Triassic	Luolou Formation	China; India; Oman; United States (Utah)	A member of the family Gondolellidae belonging to the subfamily Cornudininae. The type species is U. unicorna; genus also includes U. tridenta. The name is not available because the article lacks evidence of registering in ZooBank	

=== Research ===
- A study on the material properties of bioapatite in multiple elements in the coniform-bearing apparatus of Dapsilodus obliquicostatus, representing different ontogenetic stages of development, is published by Shohel et al. (2022).
- Redescription of Histiodella labiosa and a study on the phylogenetic affinities of members of the genus Histiodella is published by Zhen, Bauer & Bergström (2022).
- A study aiming to determine whether co-occurring Silurian conodont species from the Gotland succession in Sweden occupied different trophic niches is published by Terrill et al. (2022).
- A synthesis on the conodont occurrences along northern Gondwana at the Silurian/Devonian boundary is published by Ferretti et al. (2022).
- A study on the morphological variation of elements of the apparatus of Icriodus alternatus is published by Girard et al. (2022), who interpret their findings as indicating that subspecies of this species described for the end Frasnian and early Famennian constitute end-member morphologies characterizing different growth stages.
- A study comparing conodont diversity dynamics in Northeast Laurussia and Northeast Siberia during the Tournaisian, and evaluating its implications for the knowledge of the causes of the extinction among conodonts during the middle–late Tournaisian transition, is published by Zhuravlev & Plotitsyn (2022).
- A study on the apparatus composition of Lochriea commutata, and on its implications for the assignments of other Carbonifeous conodont species to the genus Lochriea, is published by von Bitter, Norby & Stamm (2022).
- Evidence indicative of impact of ocean temperature changes on the morphology of conodont elements during the Devonian-Carboniferous transition and the Carnian-Norian transition is presented by Souquet et al. (2022).

== Amphibians ==
=== New taxa ===
Name	Novelty	Status	Authors	Age	Type locality	Location	Notes	Images
Albanerpeton ektopistikon	Sp. nov	Valid	Carrano et al.	Early Cretaceous	Cloverly Formation	United States (Wyoming)		
Baurubatrachus santosdoroi	Sp. nov	Valid	Muzzopappa et al.	Late Cretaceous	Adamantina Formation	Brazil		
Buettnererpeton	Gen. et comb. nov	Valid	Gee & Kufner	Late Triassic	Dockum Group	Canada (Nova Scotia); United States (Texas)	A metoposaurid temnospondyl. The type species is "Buettneria" bakeri Case (1931).	
Calyptocephalella sauzalensis	Sp. nov		Nicoli et al.	Miocene	El Sauzal Formation	Argentina	A species of Calyptocephalella.	
Chemnitzion	Gen. et sp. nov	In press	Werneburg et al.	Permian (Sakmarian–Artinskian transition)	Leukersdorf Formation	Germany	A zatracheid temnospondyl. The type species is C. richteri.	
Cretadhefdaa	Gen. et sp. nov	Valid	Lemierre & Blackburn	Late Cretaceous (Cenomanian)	Kem Kem Group	Morocco	A neobatrachian frog with possible hyloid affinities. The type species is C. taouzensis.	
Marmorerpeton wakei	Sp. nov	Valid	Jones et al.	Middle Jurassic	Kilmaluag Formation	United Kingdom	A member of the family Karauridae.	
Nagini	Gen. et sp. nov	Valid	Mann, Pardo & Maddin	Carboniferous	Francis Creek Shale	United States (Illinois)	A tetrapod of uncertain phylogenetic placement, a member of the family Molgophidae. The type species is N. mazonense.	
Rhinella xerophylla	Sp. nov	In press	Ponssa et al.	Late Pliocene	Uquía Formation	Argentina	A toad, a species of Rhinella.	
Termonerpeton	Gen. et sp. nov	Valid	Clack, Smithson & Ruta	Carboniferous (Viséan)	Bathgate Hills Volcanic Formation	United Kingdom	A tetrapod of uncertain affinities, probably a stem-amniote. The type species is T. makrydactylus.	

=== Research ===
- A study on the bone histology of Whatcheeria deltae is published by Whitney et al. (2022), who interpret their findings as indicating that juveniles of W. deltae grew rapidly and reached skeletal maturity quickly.
- A study on the anatomy of the Carboniferous temnospondyl specimen from the Joggins Fossil Cliffs (Nova Scotia, Canada) referred to Dendrysekos helogenes is published by Arbez, Atkins & Maddin (2022), who consider the genus Dendrysekos to be likely junior synonym of Dendrerpeton.
- A study aiming to test whether the hindlimb of Eryops megacephalus may have been capable of salamander-like hindlimb configurations is published by Herbst, Manafzadeh & Hutchinson (2022).
- A study aiming to determine the body mass of Eryops megacephalus and Paracyclotosaurus davidi is published by Hart, Campione & McCurry (2022).
- Fossil material of large-bodied capitosaurs and a plagiosaurid is described from the Middle Triassic Fremouw Formation (Antarctica) by Gee & Sidor (2022), who also interpret the historic material from the Fremouw Formation attributed to Trematosauria as exhibiting features indicative of capitosaurian affinities.
- Redescription of Platycepsion wilkinsoni is published by Witzmann & Schoch (2022), who interpret this brachyopid as a true larva, demonstrating the presence of a larval stage in stereospondyls.
- New fossil material of Trematolestes hagdorni, providing new information on the ontogeny and adult anatomy of this temnospondyl, is described by Schoch & Mujal (2022).
- A study on the bone compactness in the pectoral girdle of Metoposaurus krasiejowensis is published by Kalita et al. (2022), who interpret their findings as indicating that compact anterior end of the interclavicles along with the heavy skull of this metoposaurid could have acted as ballast for hydrostatic buoyancy control by shifting the center of mass anteriorly.
- A study on the tooth microstructure of Metoposaurus krasiejowensis is published by Weryński & Kędzierski (2022), who report the presence of possible predatory adaptations, as well as evidence of seasonal influence on dental histology.
- Surmik et al. (2022) describe a pathological vertebral intercentrum of Metoposaurus krasiejowensis and diagnose this specimen as affected by osteosarcoma, representing the first unambiguous record of primary malignant bone tumour in a Mesozoic non-amniote.
- Redescription of Parioxys ferricolus is published by Schoch & Sues (2022).
- A study on the histology of the dorsal blades of Platyhystrix rugosus is published by Bowler, Sumida & Huttenlocker (2022).
- A study on the phylogenetic relationships of members of Amphibamiformes is published by Schoch (2022).
- Revision of the fossil record of Caudata in the Palearctic realm and a study on the biogeographical history of the group is published by Macaluso et al. (2022).
- A study on the palates of extant and fossil salamanders is published by Jia, Li & Gao (2022), who interpret their findings as indicating that palatal morphology is a reliable proxy in ecological reconstructions for early salamanders.
- An incomplete salamander dentary, possibly representing a previously unknown genus and species of batrachosauroidid, is described from the Maastrichtian Lance Formation (Wyoming, United States) by Gardner (2022).
- Skutschas et al. (2022) describe a fragmentary trunk vertebra of a crown salamander from the Bathonian Moskvoretskaya Formation (Moscow Oblast, Russia), potentially representing the oldest record of a member of Salamandroidea reported to date.
- A study on the phylogenetic relationships of extant and extinct members of the family Ceratophryidae is published by Barcelos et al. (2022).
- Fossil material of a toad belonging or related to the genus Rhinella is described from the Serravallian Cura-Mallín Formation (Chile) by Guevara et al. (2022), representing the southernmost fossil record of Bufonidae in South America for the Miocene reported to date.
- A study on the seymouriamorph tracks from the Permian (Asselian) of the Boskovice Basin (Czech Republic), representing one of the oldest known records of seymouriamorphs worldwide, is published by Calábková, Březina & Madzia (2022), who interpret these tracks as evidence of presence of terrestrial seymouriamorphs which were much larger than the largest discosauriscid specimens known from this area, and likely evidence of a habitat shift that occurred relatively late in the ontogenetic development of discosauriscids.
- A study on the anatomy and pattern of replacement of teeth in Seymouria is published by Maho & Reisz (2022).
- Jansen & Marjanović (2022) study the microanatomy of the limb bones and axial skeleton of Batropetes palatinus, infer a terrestrial lifestyle for the taxon that involved digging but not outright burrowing, and argue that the presence of strengthened forelimbs in Triadobatrachus in spite of its lack of the ability to jump might have been a former adaptation to forelimb-based digging that made jumping of later anurans possible by exaptation.
- Falk, Wings & McNamara (2022) study the taphonomy of 140 anurans from the Eocene Geiseltal Konservat-Lagerstätte, Germany.

== Synapsids ==
=== General research ===
- A study on the morphological diversity of synapsid skulls is published by Marugán-Lobón, Gómez-Recio & Nebreda (2022).

=== Non-mammalian synapsids ===
==== New taxa ====
Name	Novelty	Status	Authors	Age	Type locality	Location	Notes	Images
Bienotheroides xingshanensis	Sp. nov	Valid	Liu et al.	Middle Jurassic	Shaximiao Formation	China	A tritylodontid cynodont.	
Cifellilestes	Gen. et sp. nov	Valid	Davis et al.	Late Jurassic (Tithonian)	Morrison Formation	United States (Utah)	A morganucodontan. The type species is C. ciscoensis.	
Eoscansor	Gen. et sp. nov	Valid	Lucas et al.	Carboniferous (Pennsylvanian)	El Cobre Canyon Formation	United States (New Mexico)	A varanopid. The type species is E. cobrensis.	
Euchambersia liuyudongi	Sp. nov		Liu & Abdala	Permian (Wuchiapingian)	Naobaogou Formation	China	A therocephalian.	Skull (a, c, e, f)
Guttigomphus	Gen. et sp. nov	Valid	Rayner et al.	Probably Middle Triassic (Anisian)	Burgersdorp Formation	South Africa	A trirachodontid cynodont. The type species is G. avilionis.	
Kembawacela yajuwayeyi	Sp. nov		Araújo et al.	Permian (Wuchiapingian)	Chiweta Beds	Malawi	A dicynodont belonging to the family Cistecephalidae.	
Koksharovia	Gen. et sp. nov	Valid	Suchkova, Golubev & Shumov	Permian		Russia (Kirov Oblast)	A therocephalian. The type species is K. grechovi. Published online in 2023, but the issue date is listed as December 2022.	
Lalieudorhynchus	Gen. et sp. nov	In press	Werneburg et al.	Permian (Roadian/Wordian to early Capitanian)	La Lieude Formation	France	A caseid. The type species is L. gandi.	
Notictoides	Gen. et sp. nov		Sidor, Kulik & Huttenlocker	Early Triassic	Fremouw Formation	Antarctica	A therocephalian. Genus includes new species N. absens.	
Phorcys	Gen. et sp. nov	In press	Kammerer & Rubidge	Middle Permian (Wordian-Capitanian)	Abrahamskraal Formation	South Africa	An early gorgonopsian. The type species is P. dubei.	
Tessellatia	Gen. et sp. nov		Gaetano et al.	Late Triassic (Norian)	Los Colorados Formation	Argentina	A cynodont belonging to the group Probainognathia. The type species is T. bonapartei.	

==== Research ====
- An overview of the evolution of the brain, sensory organs and behaviour in non-mammalian synapsids is published by Benoit et al. (2022).
- A study on the anatomy of the skull of Cotylorhynchus romeri is published by Reisz, Scott & Modesto (2022).
- Evidence of serrations on the tooth crowns (possibly reflecting hypercarnivory), as well as rapid rates of development and reduced longevity of the functional teeth in Mesenosaurus efremovi from the Richards Spur locality (Oklahoma, United States) is presented by Maho et al. (2022).
- A study on the functional loading regime of the fore- and hindlimb skeleton and the body stem of therapsids, and on its implications for the knowledge of the shift from sprawling to parasagittal locomotion in therapsids, is published by Preuschoft, Krahl & Werneburg (2022).
- Fossil material of Dicynodon angielczyki is described from the Metangula Graben (Mozambique) and Luangwa Basin (Zambia) by Kammerer et al. (2022), representing the first specimens referable to this species found outside the Ruhuhu Basin (Tanzania).
- A study on the anatomy of the basicranial axis of emydopoid dicynodonts is published by Macungo et al. (2022), who provide evidence for fossorial adaptations of the basicranium in the studied taxa, and interpret these adaptations as supporting a head-lift digging behaviour for at least some cistecephalids.
- A study aiming to determine whether the fossil material of Lystrosaurus from Antarctica, South Africa, India and China conforms to Bergmann's rule is published by Kulik & Sidor (2022).
- New material of the dicynodonts Shaanbeikannemeyeria and Parakannemeyeria, providing a re-description of the morphology and taxonomy of the former taxon, is described from the Middle Triassic Ermaying Formation (Ordos Basin, Shaanxi, China) by Jun Liu (2022).
- Description of the anatomy of the mandible of Dinodontosaurus brevirostris, based on data from new specimens from the Chañares Formation (Argentina), and a study reevaluating the phylogenetic affinities of this species with the inclusion of the mandibular data is published by Escobar et al. (2022).
- Sidor (2022) describes articulated pedes of a small gorgonopsian from the upper Permian upper Madumabisa Mudstone Formation (Zambia).
- A gorgonopsian specimen is described from the Wutonggou Formation (Turpan Basin, Xinjiang, China) by Liu & Yang (2022), who interpret this specimen as indicating that gorgonopsians survived in northern warm temperate zone about ~253.3 million years ago, contemporaneous with the latest records from Russia and South Africa.
- Presence of mammal-like sternum is reported in a specimen of Gorgonops torvus from the Wuchiapingian of South Africa by Bendel et al. (2022), representing the earliest record of such sternum in a synapsid reported to date.
- A study on the pattern of tooth replacement in Cynosaurus suppostus, based on data from five specimens inferred to represent an ontogenetic growth series, is published by Norton et al. (2022).
- A study on the bone histology of Massetognathus pascuali and Probainognathus jenseni, providing evidence of uninterrupted growth pattern in Massetognathus and cyclical growth in Probainognathus, is published by Garcia Marsà, Agnolín & Novas (2022).
- A study aiming to determine the body mass of Andescynodon mendozensis, Pascualgnathus polanskii, Massetognathus pascuali, Cynognathus crateronotus and Exaeretodon argentinus on the basis of linear measurements and circumferences of postcranial elements of specimens from Triassic units of the Ischigualasto-Villa Union Basin (Argentina) is published by Filippini, Abdala & Cassini (2022).
- New fossil material of Santacruzodon hopsoni and Chiniquodon sp., providing new information on the anatomy of the former taxon, is described from the Upper Triassic Santacruzodon Assemblage Zone (Santa Cruz Sequence, Santa Maria Supersequence, Brazil) by Melo, Martinelli & Soares (2022).
- A study on the cranial ontogeny of Exaeretodon argentinus is published by Wynd, Abdala & Nesbitt (2022), who interpret their findings as likely indicating that E. argentinus underwent a dietary shift toward herbivory during growth.
- A study on the anatomy and phylogenetic affinities of Lumkuia fuzzi is published by Benoit et al. (2022).
- New fossil material of Lufengia is described from the Lower Jurassic Lufeng Formation (China) by Liu et al. (2022), who interpret Dianzhongia as described on the basis of fossil material of an older individual of Lufengia.
- Cabreira et al. (2022) provide evidence indicative of the presence of two sets of teeth falling within a range of wide variations of typically mammalian dental patterns in a Late Triassic cynodont Brasilodon, and interpret this finding as potentially pushing the origin of the biological traits related to the presence of two sets of teeth in modern mammals, such as placentation, endothermy, fur or lactation, back to the Norian.
- Jäger et al. (2022) present evidence of different morphology and different modes of the occlusion of the molars in Erythrotherium parringtoni and Morganucodon watsoni, and interpret their findings as supporting the classification of these mammaliaforms as distinct taxa.
- Description of the anatomy of the mandible and teeth of Hadrocodium wui, including new information unavailable from previous fossil preparation, is published by Luo et al. (2022).
- Araújo et al. (2022) argue that morphological changes to the endolymph-filled semicircular ducts of the inner ear of synapsids were related to changes of their body temperatures, and that endothermy evolved abruptly during the Late Triassic in Mammaliamorpha, with all stem mammaliamorphs likely being ectotherms.

== Other animals ==
=== New taxa ===
Name	Novelty	Status	Authors	Age	Type locality	Location	Notes	Images
Acanthochaetetes fischeri	Sp. nov	In press	Schlagintweit et al.	Paleocene (Thanetian)	Khurmala Formation	Iran; Iraq	A demosponge belonging to the family Acanthochaetetidae.	
Anguiscolex	Gen. et sp. nov	Valid	García-Bellido & Gutiérrez-Marco	Late Ordovician		Morocco	A palaeoscolecid worm. Genus includes new species A. africanus.	
Anjiplectella	Gen. et sp. nov		Botting et al.	Ordovician (Hirnantian)		China	A sponge belonging to the family Euplectellidae. The type species is A. davidipharus.	
Anticalyptraea madenensis	Sp. nov	In press	Zatoń et al.	Devonian		Morocco	An anticalyptraeid tubeworm.	
Archaeopetasus pachybasalis	Sp. nov	Valid	Kouchinsky in Kouchinsky et al.	Cambrian (Tommotian)	Tyuser Formation	Russia (Sakha)	A chancelloriid.	
Boreognathus	Gen. et sp. nov		Shcherbakov, Tzetlin & Zhuravlev	Permian (Kungurian)	Pechora Coal Basin	Russia	A polychaete annelid belonging to the family Atraktoprionidae. Genus includes new species B. pogorevichi.	
Buggischicyathus	Gen. et sp. nov	In press	Perejón, Menéndez & Moreno-Eiris in Rodríguez-Martínez et al.	Cambrian Series 2	Mount Wegener Formation	Antarctica	An archaeocyath belonging to the group Ajacicyathida and the family Densocyathidae. The type species is B. microporus.	
Cementula radwanskae	Sp. nov	Valid	Słowiński et al.	Middle Jurassic (Bathonian–Callovian, possibly also Bajocian)		France? Poland	A polychaete belonging to the family Serpulidae.	
Charnia gracilis	Sp. nov	Valid	Wu et al.	Ediacaran	Dengying Formation	China	A rangeomorph.	
Clathrodictyon megalamellatum	Sp. nov	Valid	Jeon in Jeon et al.	Ordovician (Katian)	Xiazhen Formation	China	A member of Stromatoporoidea belonging to the group Clathrodictyida.	
Conchicolites kroegeri	Sp. nov	Valid	Vinn et al.	Ordovician (Katian)	Hirmuse Formation	Estonia	A member of Cornulitida.	
Conchicolites parcecostatis	Sp. nov		Vinn et al.	Ordovician (Katian)	Kõrgessaare Formation	Estonia	A member of Cornulitida.	
Conchicolites sutlemaensis	Sp. nov		Vinn et al.	Ordovician (Katian)	Kõrgessaare Formation	Estonia	A member of Cornulitida.	
Cornulites lindae	Sp. nov	Valid	Vinn et al.	Ordovician (Katian)	Hirmuse Formation	Estonia	A member of Cornulitida.	
Cornulites meidlai	Sp. nov	Valid	Vinn et al.	Ordovician (Katian)	Hirmuse Formation	Estonia	A member of Cornulitida.	
Dauritheca	Nom. nov	Valid	Peel & Gubanov	Cambrian	Yuertus Formation	China; Russia (Zabaykalsky Krai)	A hyolith belonging to the group Orthothecida and the family Triplicatellidae; a replacement name for Pachytheca Qian, Yin & Xiao (2000).	
Filogranula spongiophila	Sp. nov	Valid	Słowiński et al.	Late Jurassic (Oxfordian)		Poland	A polychaete belonging to the family Serpulidae.	
Germanortmannia	Nom. nov	Valid	Ceccolini & Cianferoni	Late Cretaceous		Germany	A demosponge belonging to the group Astrophorida; a replacement name for Ortmannia Schrammen (1924).	
Hadimopanella foveata	Sp. nov	Valid	Kouchinsky in Kouchinsky et al.	Cambrian (Cambrian Stage 4)	Erkeket Formation	Russia (Sakha)	A palaeoscolecid.	
Hadimopanella luchininae	Sp. nov	Valid	Novozhilova	Early Cambrian		Russia	A palaeoscolecid.	
Iberogilletia	Nom. nov	Valid	Ceccolini & Cianferoni	Early Cretaceous (Aptian)		Spain	A demosponge belonging to the family Corallistidae; a replacement name for Gilletia Lagneau-Herenger (1962).	
Inuitiphlaskus	Gen. et sp. nov	In press	Peel	Cambrian (Wuliuan)	Henson Gletscher Formation	Greenland	A total-group priapulid. The type species is I. kouchinskyi.	
Lindstroemiella	Gen. et sp. nov	Valid	Zatoń et al.	Silurian (Ludfordian)		Estonia	A member of Tentaculita. Genus includes new species L. eichwaldi.	
Metavermilia (Vepreculina) gollieti	Sp. nov		Kočí, Goedert & Jäger	Eocene	Lincoln Creek Formation	United States (Washington)	A serpulid annelid.	
Nectocollare	Gen. et sp. nov	In press	Botting & Ma	Ordovician		United Kingdom	A sponge, possibly a member of the family Hyalonematidae. Genus includes new species N. zakdouli.	
Neodexiospira ferlinghettii	Sp. nov	Valid	Kočí, Goedert & Buckeridge	Early Eocene	Crescent Formation	United States (Washington)	A polychaete.	
Neodexiospira vanslykei	Sp. nov	Valid	Kočí, Goedert & Buckeridge	Late Eocene	Lincoln Creek Formation	United States (Washington)	A polychaete.	
Onuphionella corusca	Sp. nov	Valid	Muir et al.	Ordovician (Sandbian)	First Bani Group	Morocco	Agglutinated tubes produced by unknown animal. Published online in 2018; the final version of the article naming it was published in 2022.	
Paragnaltacyathus	Gen. et sp. nov	In press	Perejón, Menéndez & Moreno-Eiris in Rodríguez-Martínez et al.	Cambrian Series 2	Mount Wegener Formation	Antarctica	An archaeocyath belonging to the group Ajacicyathida and the family Ethmocyathidae. The type species is P. hoeflei.	
Parvibellus	Gen. et sp. nov		Liu et al.	Cambrian Stage 3	Yu'anshan Formation	China	A stem-arthropod of uncertain affinitites, possibly a siberiid lobopodian. The type species is P. atavus.	
Rotundocyathus glacius	Sp. nov	In press	Perejón, Menéndez & Moreno-Eiris in Rodríguez-Martínez et al.	Cambrian Series 2	Mount Wegener Formation	Antarctica	An archaeocyath belonging to the group Ajacicyathida and the family Ajacicyathidae.	
Salanytheca daurica	Sp. nov	Valid	Peel & Gubanov	Cambrian Series 2	Bystraya Formation	Russia (Zabaykalsky Krai)	A hyolith belonging to the group Orthothecida and the family Triplicatellidae.	
Sanshapentella tentoriformis	Sp. nov		Yun et al.	Cambrian Stage 3	Shuijingtuo Formation	China	A hexactinellid sponge.	
Santelmocyathus	Gen. et sp. nov	In press	Perejón, Menéndez & Moreno-Eiris in Rodríguez-Martínez et al.	Cambrian Series 2	Mount Wegener Formation	Antarctica	An archaeocyath belonging to the group Ajacicyathida and the family Shackletoncyathidae. The type species is S. santelmoi.	
Shackletoncyathus	Gen. et sp. nov	In press	Perejón, Menéndez & Moreno-Eiris in Rodríguez-Martínez et al.	Cambrian Series 2	Mount Wegener Formation	Antarctica	An archaeocyath belonging to the group Ajacicyathida and the family Shackletoncyathidae. The type species is S. buggischi.	
Spirobranchus limburgicus	Sp. nov	Valid	Kadolsky	Oligocene (Rupelian)	Borgloon Formation	Belgium	A serpulid annelid, a species of Spirobranchus.	
Syringodictyon nevadense	Sp. nov	Valid	Stock	Devonian (Emsian)	McColley Canyon Formation	United States (Nevada)	A member of Stromatoporoidea.	
Teutomastophorus	Nom. nov	Valid	Ceccolini & Cianferoni	Late Cretaceous		Germany	A demosponge belonging to the family Theonellidae; a replacement name for Mastophorus Schrammen (1924).	
Trinacriarbuscula	Nom. nov	Valid	Ceccolini & Cianferoni	Permian		Italy	A demosponge belonging to the group Lithistida; a replacement name for Arbuscula Parona (1933).	
Triplicatella uslonica	Sp. nov	Valid	Peel & Gubanov	Cambrian Series 2	Bystraya Formation	Russia (Zabaykalsky Krai)	A hyolith belonging to the group Orthothecida and the family Triplicatellidae.	
Turgidaspongia	Gen. et sp. nov	In press	Li et al.	Ordovician-Silurian boundary		China	A hexactinellid sponge belonging to the family Stiodermatidae. The type species is T. porosa.	
Wegenercyathus	Gen. et sp. nov	In press	Perejón, Menéndez & Moreno-Eiris in Rodríguez-Martínez et al.	Cambrian Series 2	Mount Wegener Formation	Antarctica	An archaeocyath belonging to the group Ajacicyathida and the family Rudanulidae. The type species is W. sexangulae.	
Wronascolex superstes	Sp. nov	Valid	García-Bellido & Gutiérrez-Marco	Late Ordovician		Morocco	A palaeoscolecid worm.	
Wufengella	Gen. et sp. nov	Valid	Guo et al.	Cambrian Stage 3	Chiungchussu Formation	China	A tommotiid. The type species is W. bengtsoni.	

=== Research ===
- A study on the biomarker composition of gut contents in Ediacaran macrofossils is published by Bobrovskiy et al. (2022), who interpret their findings as indicating that Calyptrina and Kimberella possessed a gut, displayed sterol metabolism comparable to extant invertebrates and fed on green algae and bacteria, while Dickinsonia shows no traces of dietary molecules, indicating a different feeding mode and possible external digestion.
- A study on the fossil record of Petalonamae, their survival of the Ediacaran–Cambrian transition and the timing and causes of their extinction is published by Hoyal Cuthill (2022).
- Redescription and a study on the life habits of Pteridinium simplex is published by Darroch et al. (2022).
- A study on the morphological variation and paleobiology of Fractofusus misrai is published by Taylor et al. (2022).
- Aragonés Suarez & Leys (2022) propose a method for identifying fossil organisms as sponge grade animals, and apply their method to a putative Ediacaran sponge Thectardis avalonensis.
- A study on the impact of oxygenation pulses during the Cambrian Radiation on archaeocyath reef communities from the Siberian Platform (Sakha, Russia), indicating that oxygenation events created temporary pulses of evolutionary diversification and enhanced ecosystem complexity, is published by Zhuravlev et al. (2022).
- Putative late Cambrian archaeocyath Antarcticocyathus webersi is reinterpreted as an anthaspidellid sponge by Lee (2022), leaving no evidence of archaeocyaths surviving beyond the middle Cambrian.
- Spongiostroma mæandrinum is reinterpreted as a keratosan demosponge by Lee & Riding (2022).
- Osés et al. (2022) describe exceptionally preserved fossil material of Corumbella werneri from the Ediacaran Tamengo Formation (Brazil), report that Corumbella had a biomineralized skeleton with a cataphract organization of calcareous plates and rings (sclerites) that enhanced flexibility, and interpret Corumbella as the oldest animal with a complex cataphract skeleton with biologically-controlled biomineralization reported to date.
- Bilaterian trace fossils originally reported from the Ediacaran Tacuarí Formation (Uruguay) are reinterpreted as actually Carboniferous–Permian in age and found in strata belonging to the San Gregorio Formation by Verde et al. (2022).
- A study on the phylogenetic affinities of Amiskwia sagittiformis is published by Bekkouche & Gąsiorowski (2022), who recover this animal as a stem-group chaetognath within the new clade Cucullophora.
- Liu et al. (2022) transfer "Ambrolinevitus" ventricosus to the genus Paramicrocornus, erect a new family Paramicrocornidae, and evaluate the implications of paramicrocornids for the knowledge of the evolution of hyoliths.
- New fossil material of Doliutheca orientalis, providing new information on the anatomy of this hyolith, is described from the Cambrian Shipai Formation (China) by Liu et al. (2022), who place this species in the family Paramicrocornidae.
- Sun, Zhao & Zhu (2022) describe new fossil material of Glossolites magnus, and interpret its anatomy as indicating that this animal wasn't a hyolith.
- Description of the internal anatomy of embryos of Markuelia hunanensis from the Cambrian (Furongian) Bitiao Formation (Hunan, China) is published by Dong et al. (2022).
- Putative early deuterostome Saccorhytus coronarius is reinterpreted as an early ecdysozoan by Liu et al. (2022).
- Strausfeld et al. (2022) describe the fossilized nervous system of Cardiodictyon catenulum, reporting the presence of an unsegmented head and brain comprising three cephalic domains, each of which aligns with one of three components of the foregut and with a pair of head appendages, and interpreting this finding as indicating that cephalic domains of C. catenulum predate the evolution of the euarthropod head; their conclusions are subsequently contested by Budd et al. (2023).
- Evidence that yunnanozoan branchial arches consisted of cellular cartilage with an extracellular matrix dominated by microfibrils (a feature hitherto considered specific to vertebrates) is presented by Tian et al. (2022), who interpret this finding as supporting the conclusion that yunnanozoans were stem vertebrates; their conclusions are subsequently contested by He et al. (2023) and Zhang & Pratt (2023).
- Redescription and a study on the affinities of Odonterpeton triangulare is published by Mann, Pardo & Sues (2022), who name a new recumbirostran clade Chthonosauria containing the families Brachystelechidae and Molgophidae.
- Klembara et al. (2022) present a reconstruction of the skull of Diadectes absitus.

== Other organisms ==
=== New taxa ===
Name	Novelty	Status	Authors	Age	Type locality	Location	Notes	Images
Beltanelliformis konovalovi	Sp. nov		Kolesnikov	Ediacaran	Chernyi Kamen Formation	Russia (Perm Krai; Sverdlovsk Oblast)		
Bursachitina baldonia	Sp. nov	Valid	Nõlvak, Liang & Hints	Ordovician (Darriwilian)	Šakyna Formation	Latvia	A chitinozoan.	
Conochitina ulsti	Sp. nov	Valid	Nõlvak, Liang & Hints	Ordovician (Darriwilian)	Šakyna Formation	Latvia	A chitinozoan.	
Eremochitina? procera	Sp. nov	Valid	Nõlvak, Liang & Hints	Ordovician (Darriwilian)	Šakyna Formation	Latvia	A chitinozoan.	
Ganarake	Gen. et sp. nov		Retallack	Ediacaran	Noonday Formation	United States (California)	Possible Ediacaran lichen. The type species is G. scalaris.	
Glaphyrobalantium	Gen. et sp. nov	Valid	Krings	Early Devonian	Rhynie chert	United Kingdom	An organism of uncertain affinities, possibly a cyanobacterium or microscopic alga. Genus includes new species G. hueberi.	
Guangweia	Gen. et sp. nov		Hu et al.	Early Cambrian		China	A frond-like fossil sharing morphological similarities with late Ediacaran frondose organisms. Genus includes new species G. cheni.	
Jiumenia	Gen. et sp. nov		Liu & Dong in Liu et al.	Ediacaran-Cambrian	Liuchapo Formation	China	A strip-like fossil. The type species is J. cingula. The generic name is preoccupied by Jiumenia Yuan (1980).	
Longbizuiella	Gen. et sp. nov	In press	Yi et al.	Ediacaran	Liuchapo Formation	China	An organism preserved as a series of uniserially-arranged, uniform-sized, spherical segments, described on the basis of fossils formerly assigned to the genus Horodyskia. The type species is L. hunanensis.	
Megasphaerella	Gen. et sp. nov	Valid	Keupp	Early Jurassic (Pliensbachian)	Amaltheenton Formation	Germany	A bivalved calcareous microfossil of uncertain affinities, possibly a member of the family Schizosphaerellaceae. Genus includes new species M. doppelsteini.	
Nenoxites irregularis	Sp. nov	In press	Yi et al.	Ediacaran	Liuchapo Formation	China	An organism preserved as uniserially arranged segments, interpret by Yi et al. (2022) as a body fossil rather than a trace fossil.	
Nenoxites jishouensis	Sp. nov	In press	Yi et al.	Ediacaran	Liuchapo Formation	China	An organism preserved as serially-arranged, uniform-sized, crescent segments, interpret by Yi et al. (2022) as a body fossil rather than a trace fossil.	
Ordinilunulatus	Gen. et comb. nov		Liu & Dong in Liu et al.	Ediacaran-Cambrian	Liuchapo Formation	China	An organism consisting of uniform, evenly spaced disk-shaped segments with a terminal spherical structure. The type species is "Palaeopascichnus" jiumenensis Dong, Xiao, Shen & Zhou (2008).	
Parahorodyskia	Gen. et sp. et comb. nov		Liu & Dong in Liu et al.	Ediacaran-Cambrian	Liuchapo Formation	China	An organism consisting of even-sized spherical and ellipsoidal segments with consistent spacing. The type species is P. disjuncta; genus also includes "Horodyskia" minor Dong, Xiao, Shen & Zhou (2008).	
Poratusiramus	Gen. et sp. nov	In press	Yi et al.	Ediacaran	Liuchapo Formation	China	An organism preserved as a long horizontal stem with side branches growing upward, with similarities to possible Cambrian dasycladalean algae such as Seletonella. The type species is P. xiangxiensis.	
Portfjeldia	Gen. et sp. nov	In press	Willman & Peel	Ediacaran	Portfjeld Formation	Greenland	An organism of uncertain affinities, possibly an alga. Genus includes new species P. aestatis.	
Retisphaeridium minimum	Sp. nov	Valid	Palacios in Palacios et al.	Cambrian	Kistedalen Formation	Norway; Poland; Sweden	An acritarch.	
Retisphaeridium rugulatum	Sp. nov	Valid	Palacios in Palacios et al.	Cambrian	Kistedalen Formation	Norway	An acritarch.	
Sphaerochitina? latviensis	Sp. nov	Valid	Nõlvak, Liang & Hints	Ordovician (Darriwilian)	Baldone Formation	Latvia	A chitinozoan.	
Tubula	Gen. et sp. nov		Golubkova et al.	Early Cambrian		Belarus	A microfossil. Genus includes new species T. tortusa.	

=== Research ===
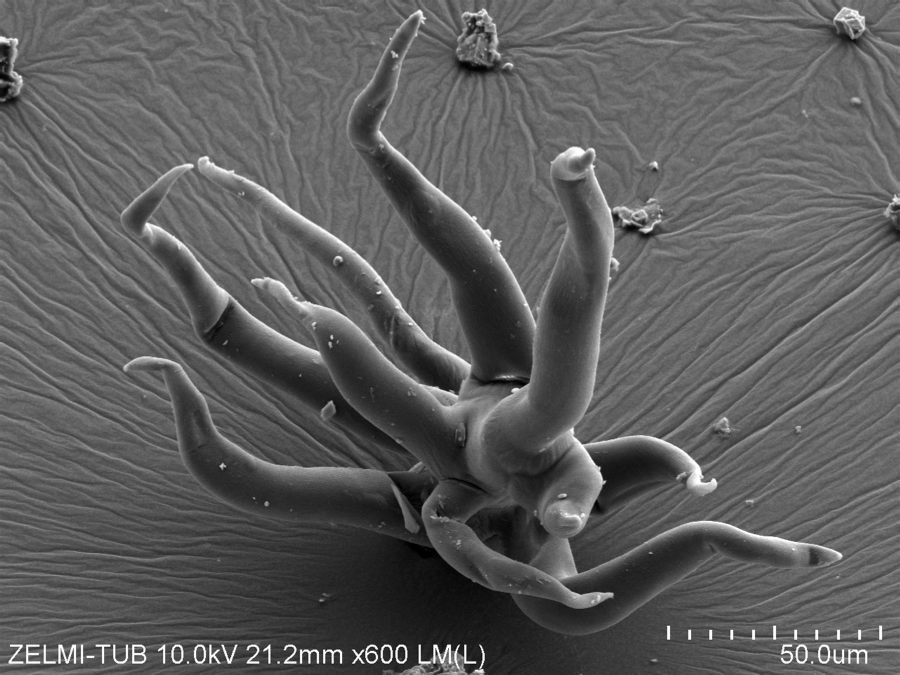
A specimen of the Volyn Biota

- Franz et al. (2022) report the find of at least 1.5-billion-years-old organisms from the Volyn pegmatite field associated with the Korosten Pluton (Ukraine), with the presence of a large variation of different types of filaments in the studied microfossils.

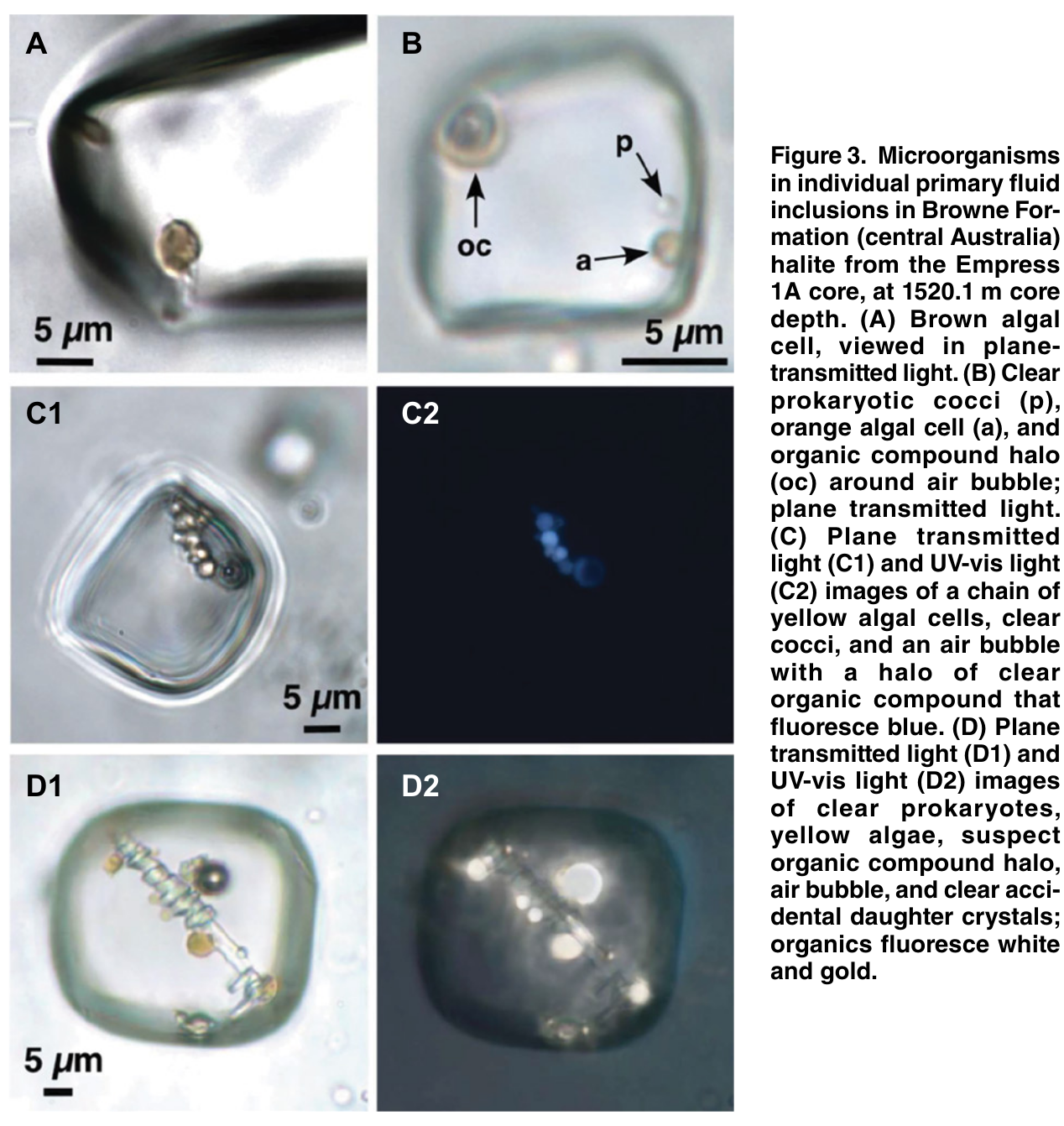
Microorganisms in individual primary fluid inclusions in halite at 1,5 km core depth

- A study on the morphometric variation, taxonomy, stratigraphic distribution and habitat settings of palaeopascichnids is published by Kolesnikov & Desiatkin (2022).
- Zhang & Zhang (2022) describe new embryo-like Megasphaera fossils from the Ediacaran Zhenba microfossil assemblage, and interpret the studied specimens as inconsistent with the metazoan interpretation of the Ediacaran Megasphaera fossils, and supporting their encysting-protist affinity.
- A study aiming to determine whether Dickinsonia grew by tissue patterning like animals or by meristems like plants and pseudomeristems like fungi, based on data from damaged specimens from the Ustʹ Pinega Formation (Russia), is published by Retallack (2022).
- Slater et al. (2022) present a global record of imprint nanoplankton fossils, and interpret their findings as contradicting the view that declines in nanofossil abundance through several past global warming events are evidence of biocalcification crises caused by ocean acidification and related factors.
- Evidence indicating that benthic foraminifera dispersed in plankton and renewed planktonic foraminifera diversity after the Cretaceous–Paleogene extinction event is presented by Morard et al. (2022).
- A study on the impact of the Paleocene–Eocene Thermal Maximum on tropical planktic foraminifera in the central Pacific Ocean is published by Hupp, Kelly & Williams (2022).
- Revision of the taxonomy, regional distribution, ecological preferences and stratigraphic significance of the middle Miocene foraminifera from the northern Namibian continental shelf is published by Bergh & Compton (2022).
- A study on the taphonomy and morphology of the type material of Charniodiscus concentricus is published by Pérez-Pinedo et al. (2022), who emend the generic diagnosis of Charniodiscus.
- Scientists report the discovery of 830 million year old microorganisms in fluid inclusions within halite that may, potentially, still be alive. According to the researchers, "This study has implications for the search for life in both terrestrial and extraterrestrial chemical sedimentary rocks."

== History of life in general ==
- Eckford-Soper et al. (2022) argue that the size distribution of preserved eukaryotic microfossils dating to 1.7 billion years ago and onward is most compatible with an active eukaryote ecosystem complete with phototrophy, osmotrophy, phagotrophy and mixotrophy.
- A study on the age of the Lantian biota is published by Yang et al. (2022).
- A study on ecosystem structure changes during the late Ediacaran is published by Eden, Manica & Mitchell (2022).
- A global database of the Ediacara Biota is compiled by Evans et al. (2022), who report that ~80% of taxa from the White Sea Ediacaran assemblage (ca. 560–550 million years old) are absent from the Nama interval (ca. 550–539 million years ago), representing a drop in diversity comparable to losses during Phanerozoic mass extinctions, and interpret their findings as indicative of existence of a link between this biotic turnover and environmental change.
- Green, Renne & Keller (2022) argue that the observed degree of temporal correlation between continental large igneous provinces and faunal turnovers in the Phanerozoic is unlikely to occur by chance, and that continental large igneous provinces might be major driver of extinctions throughout the Phanerozoic.
- A study on animal cognitive complexity in Cambrian and post-Cambrian marine ecosystems is published by Hsieh, Plotnick & Bush (2022).
- Review of the morphological, paleontological, developmental and molecular data on the early evolution of deuterostomes is published by Nanglu et al. (2022).
- A study on the fossil record of Cambrian marine invertebrates is published by Na et al. (2022), who outline time-traceable biogeographic provinces for this period and confirm an increase in regional differences of faunal composition through time.
- An association of palaeoscolecids, brachiopods and parasitic tube worms, interpreted as record of a brachiopod-dominated, vertically stratified benthic community where the different phyla filled multiple ecological niches, is reported from the Cambrian Stage 4 Wulongqing Formation (China) by Chen et al. (2022).
- Sun et al. (2022) report the discovery of the Linyi Lagerstätte, a new Drumian lagerstätte from the Zhangxia Formation (Shandong, China) containing a diverse and well-preserved Burgess Shale-type fossil assemblage.
- A study on the ecological processes that structured the composition of trilobite and echinoderm communities from the Central Anti-Atlas (Morocco), Montagne Noire (France) and Cordillera Oriental (Argentina) during the Early Ordovician is published by Saleh et al. (2022).
- A new tropical Lagerstätte containing a variety of soft tissues and rich shelly fossils, and preserving a fauna consisting of Cambrian relics as well as of taxa which originated during the Ordovician (Liexi fauna), is reported from the Lower Ordovician Madaoyu Formation (Hunan, China) by Fang et al. (2022).
- Saleh et al. (2022) describe a new fossil locality from the Ordovician Fezouata Shale (Morocco) named Taichoute, dominated by three-dimensionally preserved and heavily sclerotized fragments of large euarthropods, and extending the temporal distribution of fossil preservation from this formation into the upper Floian.
- Evidence of symbiotic associations of stromatoporoids with soft-bodied worms, calcareous tentaculitoid tubeworms and rugosans, as well as evidence of symbiotic associations of tabulate corals with cornulitids, is reported from the Silurian of Baltica (Belarus, Moldova, Russia and Ukraine) by Borisenko et al. (2022).
- Zapalski et al. (2022) report fossils of the cystoporate bryozoan Fistulipora przhidolensis and unidentified trepostomes intergrown with auloporid tabulate corals and putative hydrozoans from the Silurian (Přídolí) Ohesaare Formation (Estonia), and interpret the studied bryozoans and cnidarians as forming mutually beneficial associations, representing the oldest cases of such associations reported to date.
- A study on the coprolite material from early Tournaisian lacustrine facies at Celsius Bjerg on Ymer Ø in East Greenland is published by Byrne et al. (2022), who identify a greater number of coprolite morphotypes compared to vertebrate taxa known from skeletal material, and interpret this finding as indicative of unexpectedly high vertebrate diversity in the immediate aftermath of the late Devonian extinction.
- A study on patterns of latitudinal diversity gradients of marine invertebrate fossils during climatic changes from the Carboniferous icehouse to the Triassic greenhouse climates is published by Zhang, Shen & Erwin (2022), who interpret their findings as indicating that peaks of the latitudinal diversity gradients may be shaped by multiple factors rather than alternating icehouse and greenhouse climates.
- A study on the modifications to cranial anatomy in the early evolution of tetrapods is published by Rawson et al. (2022), who interpret their findings as indicating that reduction in the number of skull bones across the origin of tetrapods was associated with increased density (remaining bones acquired more connections), but also with skulls with fewer bones becoming more integrated and less modular across the fish-tetrapod transition, while no such change to skull construction was found between the first stem tetrapods and crown tetrapods from later in the Paleozoic.
- A study on rates of evolution and evolutionary constraints during the earliest (Carboniferous–early Permian) radiation of amniotes across their anatomy, examining differences between early synapsids and early reptiles, is published by Brocklehurst, Ford & Benson (2022).
- Review of the stratigraphic and paleontological data on the Permian equatorial ecosystem from Mallorca (Spain) is published by Matamales-Andreu et al. (2022).
- New fossil material from the Le Bousquet site in the Permian (Cisuralian) Red Sandstone Group of the Rodez Basin (France), including traces of protostomes, trails of fishes and tetrapod tracks, as well as remains of jellyfishes and plants, is described by Moreau & Gand (2022).
- Prevec et al. (2022) report a new Permian (probably early Wordian) fossil locality from the Karoo Basin in the Northern Cape Province, South Africa (the Onder Karoo locality), featuring a large abundance of exceptionally preserved fossils of freshwater and terrestrial insects, arachnids and plants.
- A study on changes in species composition of the brachiopod fossil record from the Permian Kapp Starostin Formation (Spitsbergen, Norway), and on their implications for the knowledge of the global significance of the Capitanian mass extinction event, is published by Lee et al. (2022).
- A study on changes in the composition of the Sundyr tetrapod assemblage (Russia) during the Middle-Late Permian transition is published by Shishkin (2022).
- Revision of tetrapod tracks from the Capitanian Pélitique Formation (France) is published by Marchetti et al. (2022).
- Review of the patterns of the Permian–Triassic extinction event in the ocean and on land, discussing the hypotheses surrounding the kill mechanisms of this extinction, is published by Dal Corso et al. (2022).
- A study on the ecological selectivity of marine extinctions across the end-Permian mass extinction in the South China region is published by Foster et al. (2022).
- A study on trace fossils from 400 horizons in 26 sections in South China and adjacent regions, spanning the uppermost Permian to topmost Lower Triassic strata, is published by Feng et al. (2022), who interpret their findings as indicating that a well-established infaunal ecologic structure developed in the late Early Triassic, before the full restoration of the epifauna-dominated ecosystem in the Middle Triassic.
- A study on an outcrop containing hundreds of Induan tetrapod fossils in the southern Karoo Basin of South Africa, including clusters of up to eight closely spaced Lystrosaurus skeletons (two of which display an envelope which is likely a permineralised mummified skin), is published by Smith, Botha & Viglietti (2022), who interpret this finding as evidence for episodes of drought-induced mass death, indicative of intensification of continental aridity ~252 million years ago by greenhouse gasses from the Siberian traps.
- A study on the ecological state of the Early Triassic benthic fauna from the Hiraiso Formation (Japan), comparing it with coeval assemblages from around the world, is published by Foster et al. (2022), who interpret their findings as indicating that the studied fauna represents an advanced stage of ecological recovery for the Early Triassic, but not full recovery, and interpret the distribution of the Early Triassic benthic faunas as consistent with the existence of oxygenated habitats associated with shallow marine shelves, serving as refuges for benthic marine ecosystems during the anoxic events, but also argue that the existence of such shallow marine habitable zones was not restricted solely to the anoxic events, and that recovery in shallow marine environments after the end-Permian mass extinction was delayed by some factor other than oxygen stress.
- Revision of the vertebrate fossil material from the Lower Triassic of the Big Bogdo Mountain (Astrakhan Oblast, Russia) is published by Novikov, Sennikov & Uliakhin (2022), who describe fossil material of land reptiles from the nearshore marine Bogdо Formation which might represent the first record of erythrosuchids from this locality.
- Diverse assemblage of tetrapods, including a lonchorhynchine trematosaurid, at least two taxa of capitosauroid temnospondyls, a kannemeyeriiform dicynodont, procolophonid parareptiles and several taxa of archosauromorph reptiles (including the first definite record of Tanystropheus from eastern North America), is described from the Middle Triassic Economy Member of the Wolfville Formation (Nova Scotia, Canada) by Sues et al. (2022).
- Otero et al. (2022) describe new vertebrate remains from the Triassic "Estratos El Bordo" unit in the Atacama Desert (Chile), including freshwater ray-finned fishes and the first known temnospondyl material from the El Bordo Basin.
- Shi, Chen & Liu (2022) report a new tetrapod locality from the Upper Triassic Tanzhuang Formation (Jiyuan, China), preserving fossil material of a capitosauroid belonging or closely related to the genus Mastodonsaurus (expanding the distribution of its lineage to the Late Triassic of East Asia) and a pelvis of a tetrapod of uncertain affinities.
- Feng et al. (2022) present evidence of a trophic cascade from the Upper Triassic Xujiahe Formation (Sichuan, China), describing insect eggs placed between the upper and lower cuticles of the ginkgophyte Baiera multipartita, and interpreting punctures on the eggshell surfaces as indicating that the studied eggs were damaged by a predatory insect.
- A study on the thermal ecology of 13 terrestrial Late Triassic amniotes (synapsids and archosauromorph reptiles) is published by Hartman et al. (2022), who report that thermal tolerances are sufficient to constrain the latitudinal distribution of the studied taxa, with small mammaliamorphs being able to persist at high latitudes with nocturnal activity and daytime burrowing.
- A study on the impact Early Jurassic Jenkyns Event, affecting terrestrial environments with global warming, perturbation of the carbon cycle, enhanced weathering and wildfires, on terrestrial ecosystems, including plant and dinosaur assemblages, is published by Reolid, Ruebsam & Benton (2022).
- Allain et al. (2022) describe the Berriasian continental vertebrate fauna from the Angeac-Charente bonebed (France).
- A study on the diversity of the vertebrates in the Yanliao Biota, comparing this biota with other biotas of similar age, is published by Liu, Wu & Han (2022).
- Revision of the Early Cretaceous vertebrate fauna from the Khok Pha Suam locality (Khok Kruat Formation, Thailand) is published by Manitkoon et al. (2022).
- Pochat-Cottilloux, Allain & Lasseron (2022) describe the microvertebrate remains from the Lower Cretaceous Gadoufaoua deposits in the Iullemmeden Basin (Niger), including the first fossil material of Tribodus, Amiiformes, frogs, ornithocheirid pterosaurs and a stem-boreosphenidan mammal from Gadoufaoua.
- Revision of the Cenomanian continental vertebrate fauna from the Gara Samani area (Algeria) is published by Benyoucef et al. (2022).
- New fossil material of marine vertebrates (ptychodontid sharks, enchodontid teleosts and mosasaurs) is described from the Upper Cretaceous (Coniacian-Santonian) Karababa Formation (Turkey) by Bardet et al. (2022), extending known geographic range of the genera Platecarpus and Enchodus, and possibly of the species Ptychodus mortoni.
- A diverse biotic community comprising bacteria, fungi, nematodes, several types of arthropods, and marine bivalves is reported from the fossil wood assemblage from the Santonian Mzamba Formation (South Africa) by Philippe et al. (2022).
- A diverse vertebrate fauna, sharing similarities with lowland to marginal marine ecosystems in the Oldman and Dinosaur Park formations (which were deposited in southern Alberta prior to the gap in the terrestrial fossil record caused by a transgression of the inland Bearpaw Seaway during the latter part of the Campanian), is described from the Unit 3 of the strictly terrestrial Wapiti Formation (Alberta, Canada) by Fanti et al. (2022).
- Description of the Late Cretaceous (Campanian–Maastrichtian) vertebrate fauna from the J&M site (Williams Fork Formation; Colorado, United States) is published by Brand et al. (2022).
- A study on the Late Cretaceous trace fossil assemblage from the Chicxulub area (Gulf of Mexico), revealing the presence of a diverse macrobenthic tracemaker community in the Yucatán area prior to the Chicxulub impact event, is published by Rodríguez-Tovar et al. (2022).
- A study on the magnitude of ecological change from the Campanian to the Danian, as indicated by fossil record of North American vertebrates, is published by García-Girón et al. (2022), who interpret their findings as indicative of trophic restructuring in the latest Cretaceous dinosaur faunas, with decline of megaherbivores being counterbalanced by stronger influence of medium-sized species on Maastrichtian food webs, but otherwise indicating that dinosaur niches were stable and static, which might have placed dinosaurs at a disadvantage in the event of an abrupt shutdown of the trophic network, while smaller vertebrates, including mammals, consistently increased their impact on food webs, beginning in the latest Cretaceous and continuing in the Paleocene.
- Khand et al. (2022) report the discovery of new fossiliferous localities from the Paleogene Naran Bulak Formation (Mongolia), preserving ostracod fossils and a mammal fauna that does not fit easily with established biostratigraphic patterns, with fossils of Archaeolambda and Palaeostylops (suggesting a Paleocene age) co-occurring with fossils of Gomphos elkema (suggesting an Eocene age).
- Revision of the vertebrate fossil material from the Miocene deposits of the Zaysan Basin in Central Asia is published by Kovalchuk et al. (2022), who argue that the studied fossil indicate an Early Miocene age of the Zaysan Formation, and report amiid remains representing the most recent record of the family (and of Halecomorphi in general) outside North America reported to date.
- McCurry et al. (2022) report the discovery of a new Miocene Lagerstätte named McGraths Flat (New South Wales, Australia), preserving a rich diversity of microfossils, plants, insects, spiders, and vertebrate remains, and preserving evidence of several species interactions, including predation, parasitism and pollination.
- Revision of the late Miocene vertebrate fauna of Builstyn Khudag (Mongolia) is published by Daxner-Höck et al. (2022).
- A study on the relationship between landscape and climatic changes and the evolution of the late Miocene faunas of terrestrial vertebrates and marine mammals of southeastern Europe is published by Zelenkov et al. (2022).
- Kostopoulos et al. (2022) report a new Lower Pleistocene (probably late Villafranchian) vertebrate site, Krimni-3, from Mygdonia Basin (Greece), preserving fossil material of several taxa of mammals, as well as a femur of Pachystruthio dmanisensis, representing the southernmost known occurrence of this species, as well as the first record of a giant ostrich in Greece and southeastern Europe in general.
- Kjær et al. (2022) report the discovery of ancient environmental DNA from Kap København Formation in North Greenland, interpreted as indicative of the presence of an open boreal forest with diverse plant and animal species (including mastodons, reindeer, hares, rodents, geese, horseshoe crabs and green algae) approximately two million years ago, representing an ecosystem that has no present-day analogue.
- Fernández-Monescillo et al. (2022) document fossil material of the notoungulate species Mesotherium cristatum from the middle Pleistocene deposits in the west Pampean Region of the Córdoba Province (Argentina), representing a new Last Appearance Datum for this species, and interpret this finding as indicating M. cristatum should no longer be considered as the guide taxon of the Ensenadan, and that the temporal boundaries of the biostratigraphic units established for the Pampean Region can only be supported by fossil evidence and not by the temporal boundaries of the chronostratigraphic units as has been used so far.
- A study on the stratigraphy and age for the Trinil site (Java, Indonesia) and its fossils is published by Hilgen et al. (2022), who interpret their findings as challenging the assumption that the Trinil H. K. Fauna – which includes Homo erectus – is a homogeneous biostratigraphic unit.
- Evidence from the sedimentary ancient DNA from the Batagay megaslump (Sakha, Russia) indicative of ecosystem-wide changes between Pleistocene glacial and interglacial intervals in East Siberia is presented by Courtin et al. (2022).
- A study on the impact of the extinct Neotropical megafauna on the variability in plant functional traits and biome geography in Central and South America is published by Dantas & Pausas (2022).
- A study on the relative abundances of fossil squamates and anurans from McEachern's Deathtrap Cave (Australia), aiming to determine whether compositional changes of this fauna during the last ~14,000 years were related to late Pleistocene–Holocene climatic fluctuations, is published by Ramm et al. (2022).
- A study aiming to reconstruct Holocene feeding guilds in extinct megaherbivores of Madagascar on the basis of carbon and nitrogen isotope data is published by Hansford & Turvey (2022).
- A study on the daily dentine apposition rates in extant and fossil amniotes, aiming to test the hypothesized daily limits of odontoblast activity, examine phylogenetic and allometric patterns of dentine growth evolution and reconstruct ancestral states of daily dentine apposition for major amniote clades, is published by Finch & D'Emic (2022).
- A study on the evolutionary history of the major patterns of primary ossification of the vertebral column in living and fossil amniotes, incorporating data from exceptionally well-preserved fossils of Mesosaurus tenuidens, is published by Verrière, Fröbisch & Fröbisch (2022), who interpret their findings as indicative of stability of vertebral development patterns in amniotes since their common ancestor.

== Other research ==
- A study aiming to infer atmospheric oxygen concentrations over the past 1.5 billion years is published by Krause et al. (2022), who interpret their findings as indicating that there was no simple unidirectional rise in atmospheric oxygen levels during the Neoproterozoic and the first animals evolved against a backdrop of extreme O_{2} variability, with atmospheric O_{2} levels oscillating between ~1 and ~50% of the present atmospheric level during the Neoproterozoic.
- A study on the diagnostic characteristics of the Chengjiang Biota deposit and on its sedimentary environment is published by Saleh et al. (2022).
- Zhao et al. (2022) use a continuous astronomical signal detected as geochemical variations in the late Cambrian Alum Shale Formation (Sweden) to establish a 16-million-years-long astronomical time scale, providing detailed temporal constraints on the paleoenvironmental and biological changes during the late Cambrian.
- Evidence of rapid marine oxygen fluctuations in the Late Ordovician oceans, with strong temporal link to mass extinction pulses at the end of the Ordovician, is presented by Kozik et al. (2022).
- Jing et al. (2022) present evidence of the occurrence of a true polar wander event 450–440 million years ago, and interpret this event as explaining the timing and migration of glacial centers across Gondwana, as well as the protracted end-Ordovician mass extinction.
- Evidence indicating that the evolution of vascular plants and the expansion of terrestrial vegetation initiated at the end of the Llandovery Epoch enhanced the complexity of weathering and sedimentary systems and altered the composition of continental crust is presented by Spencer et al. (2022).
- A study on the lithology and stratigraphy of the Famennian-aged Lebedjan Formation (Lipetsk Oblast, Russia), on the composition of the Lebedjan biota and on its paleoenvironment, is published by Bicknell & Naugolnykh (2022).
- A study on the development of the mid-late Cisuralian environments and ecosystems in central Pangaea, based on data from the late Cisuralian fossil assemblage of the Southern Alps and its comparison with other Cisuralian assemblages, is published by Marchetti et al. (2022).
- A study on the age of the vertebrate-bearing Permian deposits of the Chickasha Formation (Oklahoma, United States) and San Angelo Formation (Texas, United States) is published by Laurin & Hook (2022).
- The first shallow-marine methane seeps reported from the Australian Upper Paleozoic, as well as a new seep biota, are described from the Sakmarian lower Holmwood Shale in the Irwin Basin by Haig et al. (2022).
- Revision of the biostratigraphy of the Permian to Triassic Beaufort Group (Karoo Supergroup; South Africa) is published by Viglietti et al. (2022).
- A study on the timeline and character of environmental changes in the Bowen Basin (Queensland, Australia) leading up to the Permian–Triassic extinction event is published by Fielding et al. (2022).
- A study investigating fossilised shells of gastropods and bivalves from the Permian–Triassic succession exposed at Lusitaniadalen (Svalbard, Norway) for dissolution and repair marks, and aiming to determine whether a worldwide ocean acidification event occurred during the Permian–Triassic transition, is published by Foster et al. (2022).
- A study on changes of lithium and strontium isotope composition of seawater in the Permian to Early Triassic is published by Cao et al. (2022), who report evidence of a sharp decrease of the lithium isotope composition of seawater in the Late Permian and of persistence of low seawater lithium isotope values throughout the Early Triassic, interpreted by the authors as likely caused by increased reverse weathering rates, potentially explaining the failure of chemical weathering to draw down atmospheric CO_{2} levels during the Early Triassic.
- A continuous record of atmospheric CO_{2} during the Permian-Triassic transition from the Shangsi section (China) is presente by Shen et al. (2022), who also study changes of marine phytoplankton community structure across this interval, and interpret their findings as indicating that while the first extinction pulse of the Permian–Triassic extinction event in the latest Permian appears to have been associated with intense initial weathering that briefly suppressed the atmospheric CO_{2}, it was followed by a rapid rise to a prolonged high atmospheric CO_{2}, and the second extinction pulse in the Early Triassic was sustained by food web collapse driven by the expansion of bacterial production in response to oligotrophic conditions.
- Evidence from the Bristol Channel Basin (United Kingdom), indicating that intensive euxinia and acidification driven by Central Atlantic magmatic province activity formed a two-pronged kill mechanism at the end-Triassic mass extinction, is presented by Fox et al. (2022).
- Onoue et al. (2022) present a continental weathering record in the northwestern Tethys during the end-Triassic mass extinction event, inferred from strontium, carbon and oxygen isotope data from carbonate–clastic deposits in the Kardolína section (Slovakia), and interpret their findings as indicating that the marine environment in the Late Triassic European basins may have developed an oxygen minimum zone due to the increase in continental weathering during the latest Rhaetian, which might have had an important role in the marine end-Triassic extinction.
- Review of the late Early Jurassic Karoo biota from southern Africa and its geological framework is published by Bordy et al. (2022).
- A study on the age of the Early Cretaceous fossil assemblage from the Moqi fossil bed (China) is published by Yu et al. (2022).
- Rodríguez-López et al. (2022) report evidence from the Lower Cretaceous Luohe Formation (Ordos Basin, China) interpreted as indicative of the occurrence of permafrost in a plateau desert during the Cretaceous supergreenhouse, analogous to modern permafrost in the Western Himalayas.
- Beveridge et al. (2022) present new radioisotopic ages for the Campanian Wahweap Formation (Utah, United States), a lithostratigraphic revision and a review of the spatio-temporal distribution of vertebrate fossils from this formation, including revised ages for early tyrannosaurid, hadrosaurid and centrosaurine dinosaurs.
- A set of geochronologic data from the Campanian geological formations of North America's Western Interior Basin is presented by Ramezani et al. (2022), who consider their findings to be indicative of significant age overlap between the main fossil-bearing intervals of the Kaiparowits, Judith River, Two Medicine and Dinosaur Park formations, and interpret their findings as refuting inferences that the proposed latitudinal provinciality of the Campanian dinosaur taxa is only an artefact of age misinterpretation.
- A study on the age of the Cape Lamb Member of the Snow Hill Island Formation and of the overlying Sandwich Bluff Member of the López de Bertodano Formation (Vega Island, Antarctica) is published by Roberts et al. (2022), who interpret their findings as indicating that Mesozoic marine vertebrates and non-avian dinosaurs persisted in Antarctica up to the terminal Cretaceous.
- Nicholson et al. (2022) present evidence of a previously unidentified probable impact crater (Nadir crater) on the southwest Guinea Terrace (offshore West Africa, exclusive economic zone of Guinea), interpreted as formed at or near the Cretaceous-Paleogene boundary and approximately the same age as the Chicxulub impact crater, and possibly formed by an impactor which broke off from the larger Chicxulub asteroid or was a part of a longer-lived impact cluster.
- A study on the bone apposition in three paddlefish dentaries and three sturgeon pectoral fin spines from the Tanis site (North Dakota, United States), aiming to pinpoint the season in which bone apposition terminated, is published by During et al. (2022), who interpret their findings as indicating that the impact that caused the Cretaceous–Paleogene extinction event took place during boreal spring.
- Review of the environmental consequences of the Chicxulub impact at the Cretaceous–Paleogene boundary is published by Morgan et al. (2022).
- Auderset et al. (2022) present evidence from foraminifera-bound nitrogen isotopes interpreted as indicating that during the Early Eocene Climatic Optimum and Middle Miocene Climatic Optimum the ocean's oxygen-deficient zones contracted rather than expanded.
- Brachert et al. (2022) present oxygen and carbon isotope time series from reef corals from the Middle Eocene Climatic Optimum (~40 million years ago) from the sands of Auvers (France), who interpret their findings as providing evidence of zooxanthellate symbiosis in tropical reef corals of the Paleogene, as well as providing evidence of subdued sea surface temperature seasonality of 7° to 8 °C during the Middle Eocene Climatic Optimum.
- Evidence of preservation of porphyrins in a gar belonging to the genus Atractosteus from the Messel pit (Germany), possibly representing diagenetically altered heme originating from the fossil, is presented by Siljeström, Neubeck & Steele (2022).
- A study on the early Oligocene-middle Miocene wildfire history of the northern Tibetan Plateau and on the relationship between wildfire frequencies and temperature changes, based on data from sedimentary records of the microcharcoals from the Qaidam Basin, is published by Miao et al. (2022).
- New information of the age, stratigraphy, biota and palaeoenvironment of the Miocene Els Casots site (Vallès-Penedès Basin; Catalonia, Spain) is presented by Casanovas-Vilar et al. (2022).
- A study aiming to reconstruct the middle Miocene habitats on the northern North American Great Plains, as indicated by stable carbon isotope data from a wide variety of fossil ungulates from four local faunas in Nebraska of late Barstovian age, is published by Nguy & Secord (2022).
- Miao et al. (2022) present evidence from pollen records from the northern Tibet plateau, interpreted as indicating that the plateau obtained its current elevation approximately 10 million years ago.
- A study on the environmental variability in Africa during the Pliocene and Pleistocene, and on the impact of this environmental variability on the evolution of African mammals, is published by Cohen et al. (2022).
- A study on the habitat types at the Woranso-Mille site (Ethiopia) during the Pliocene, and on factors which allowed the coexistence of more than one species of Australopithecus at the site, is published by Denise Su & Yohannes Haile-Selassie (2022).
- A study on the environmental context of hominin evolution in the Plio-Pleistocene of Africa, as indicated by oxygen and carbon enamel isotope data from carnivorans from the Omo Group of the Turkana Basin (Kenya), is published by Hopley et al. (2022).
- Zachariasse & Lourens (2022) interpret the sediments from Crete (Greece) preserving the Trachilos footprints as late Pliocene in age, thus dating to the time when Crete was separated from mainland Greece and Turkey by stretches of deep water which were at least 100 km wide, and interpret this finding as indicating that the putative footprints were highly unlikely to be produced by hominins, and casting doubts on whether they were footprints at all.
- A study on the age of the Xiashagou Fauna from the Nihewan Basin in northern China is published by Tu et al. (2022), who interpret the age of this fauna as consistent with the ages of the Senèze and Olivola Faunas in Europe, and possibly indicative of the existence of an ecological corridor for faunal dispersals across northern Eurasia during the early Pleistocene.
- Evidence of the association of burnt tusk and burnt lithics within a clearly defined archaeological horizon at the Lower Paleolithic site of Evron Quarry (Israel), dated between 1.0 and 0.8 Mya and lacking visual signatures for fire, is presented by Stepka et al. (2022).
- A study on the relative importance of six drivers of vegetation change (moisture availability, fire activity, mammalian herbivore density, temperature, temperature seasonality, CO_{2}) in western Africa over the past ~500,000 years, comparing past environmental change data from Lake Bosumtwi (Ghana) with global data, is published by Gosling et al. (2022), who interpret their findings as indicating that shifts in atmospheric CO_{2} concentrations did not drive changes in woody cover in the tropics at the millennial scale.
- A study aiming to reconstruct the history of sea level at the Bering Strait since 46,000 years ago is published by Farmer et al. (2022), who find that the Bering Strait was open from at least 46,000 until 35,700 years ago, dating the last formation of the land bridge to within 10,000 years of the Last Glacial Maximum.
- Woolly mammoth, steppe bison, caballine horse and willow ptarmigan mitochondrial genomes are reconstructed from samples of permafrost silts from central Yukon (Canada) spanning the last 30,000 years by Murchie et al. (2022).
- A study on the timing of the opening of the ice-free corridor along the eastern front of the Rocky Mountains in the late Pleistocene, aiming to determine whether this corridor was available for the first peopling of the Americas after the Last Glacial Maximum, is published by Clark et al. (2022).
- Wiemann & Briggs (2022) demonstrated the presence of different biological signals in Raman and Fourier-transform infrared spectroscopy data of a diversity of carbonaceous animal fossils through independent laboratory confirmation (2022).
- A study on the impact of food hardness and size on the morphology of the mandible of extant pigs, and on its implications for the use of mandibular morphology as a proxy in paleodietary reconstructions, is published by Neaux et al. (2022).
- Amano et al. (2022) present a method to mathematically isolate and selectively eliminate the taphonomic deformation of a fossil skull for restoration of its original appearance, and apply this method to reconstruction of a skull of Mesopithecus from the late Miocene of Greece.
- Demuth et al. (2022) present a new method for volumetric three-dimensional reconstructions of musculature in extant and extinct taxa, and apply this method to reconstruction of the hindlimb musculature of Euparkeria capensis.
- Lallensack & Falkingham (2022) present a new method that allows for estimating limb phase based on variation patterns in long trackways, and use this method to estimate limb phases of giant wide-gauged sauropod dinosaurs that produced three long trackways from the Albian De Queen Formation (Arkansas, United States).
- Gates et al. (2022) present new method that allows for differentiation of various geographic distributional hypotheses using information from the fossil record about entire communities, apply this method to datasets of pollen and ceratopsid dinosaurs from the Late Cretaceous Western Interior Basin of North America, and interpret their findings as indicative of the presence of two plant communities with a transition zone of unknown width between them, while finding no evidence of a biogeographical pattern in the distribution of ceratopsids.
- Survey of examples of scientific practices stemming from colonialism, focusing on the studies of fossils from Brazil (Araripe Basin) and Mexico (Sabinas, La Popa and Parras basins) published during 1990–2021, is published by Cisneros et al. (2022), who propose recommendations to scientists, journals, museums, research institutions and government and funding agencies to overcome these practices.
- A study on the history and legality of Myanmar amber use in the literature, providing evidence of links between research interest in Myanmar amber and major political, legal and economic changes, and indicating that the vast majority of publications on this amber do not include researchers from Myanmar as co-authors, is published by Dunne et al. (2022).
- Stewens, Raja & Dunne (2022) review the history of fossil removal under colonial rule, and evaluate potential avenues for their return under public international law.

=== Paleoclimate ===
- Evidence indicating that the global warming which led to the end-Permian mass extinction was initiated by emissions of large quantities of high temperature methane generated from oils from a large igneous province is presented by Chen et al. (2022).
- Evidence oxygen isotope ratios from Changhsingian ostracods of north-western Iran, interpreted as indicative of gradual rise of ambient seawater temperature beginning at least 300,000 years prior to the main extinction event of the end-Permian mass extinction, is presented by Gliwa et al. (2022).
- Joachimski et al. (2022) reconstruct late Permian to Middle Triassic atmospheric CO_{2} record, and interpret their findings as indicative of an approximate fold increase in pCO_{2} from the latest Permian to Early Triassic.
- A study on the climate response to orbital variations in a Late Triassic midlatitude temperate setting in Jameson Land (Greenland) and the tropical low paleolatitude setting of the Newark Basin is published by Mau, Kent & Clemmensen (2022).
- Olsen et al. (2022) present evidence from the Late Triassic and Early Jurassic strata of the Junggar Basin (northwest China) indicating that, despite extraordinary high partial pressure of CO_{2}, freezing winter temperatures characterized high Pangaean latitudes during the early Mesozoic.
- Jones, Petersen & Curley (2022) report carbonate clumped isotope paleotemperatures of the mid-Cretaceous thermal maximum measured from Cenomanian oyster fossils of the Western Interior Seaway, and interpret their findings as indicative of extreme mid-latitude warmth in North America.
- A study on the latitudinal temperature gradient over the last 95 million years, as indicated by data from planktonic foraminifera δ^{18}O, is published by Gaskell et al. (2022).
- A study on the sulfur isotope anomalies in the Cretaceous-Paleogene boundary impact debris and overlying sediments is published by Junium et al. (2022), who interpret their findings as evidence of injection of massive amounts of sulfur into the stratosphere in the aftermath of the Chicxulub impact, and evidence of the role of the sulfur-bearing gases in driving a postimpact winter.
- A study on changes of deep ocean temperature across the past 65 million years, inferred from clumped isotope thermometry, is published by Meckler et al. (2022), whose temperature estimates from the deep Atlantic Ocean are overall much warmer compared with oxygen isotope–based reconstructions.
- A study on climate changes in central China from the late Palaeocene to early Eocene, inferred from palynological assemblages in the Tantou Basin (Henan, China), is published by Su et al. (2022), who interpret their findings as indicative of a sudden climate change in the early Eocene which might signal the emergence of the East Asian Monsoon.
- Agterhuis et al. (2022) report deep-sea temperature estimates across the Eocene Thermal Maximum 2 and the hyperthermal event that occurred approximately 2 million years after the Paleocene–Eocene Thermal Maximum (approximately 54 million years ago).
- A study on the climatic impact of oceanic gateway changes at the Eocene–Oligocene Transition is published by Straume et al. (2022).
- A study on the ocean crustal production (a proxy for tectonic degassing of carbon) since the Miocene is published by Herbert et al. (2022), who argue that changes in tectonic degassing of carbon can account for the majority of long-term ice sheet and global temperature evolution throughout the past 20 million years.
- A study on the impact of climate variability on the evolution of early African Homo, Eurasian Homo erectus, Homo heidelbergensis, Neanderthals and modern humans is published by Timmermann et al. (2022).
- Foerster et al. (2022) present a 620,000-year environmental record from Chew Bahir (Ethiopia), providing evidence of three distinct phases of climate variability in eastern Africa which coincided with shifts in hominin evolution and dispersal.
- Evidence of five phases of lake development at Tayma (Saudi Arabia) is presented by Neugebauer et al. (2022), who interpret their findings as indicative of unexpectedly short duration (dating from 8800 to 7900 years before present) of the Holocene Humid Period in Northern Arabia.
