= Denay =

Denay may refer to:

- Denay Valley, a valley in Eureka County, Nevada, United States
  - Denay Limestone, a geological formation in the Denay Valley
- Denay Jock Chagor, South Sudanese politician
- Jessica Denay, American writer
