= Coils Creek Limestone =

Geologic formation in Nevada, United States

- Stratigraphic range: Devonian
- Type: Formation
- Unit of: McColley Canyon Formation
- Underlies: Denay Limestone
- Overlies: Bartine Member

Location
- Region: Nevada
- Country: United States

The Coils Creek Limestone is a geologic formation in Nevada. It preserves fossils dating back to the Devonian period.

== See also ==
- List of fossiliferous stratigraphic units in Nevada
- Paleontology in Nevada
