= Rhinella xerophylla =

Rhinella xerophylla Temporal range: Pliocene

Scientific classification
- Kingdom: Animalia
- Phylum: Chordata
- Class: Amphibia
- Order: Anura
- Family: Bufonidae
- Genus: Rhinella
- Species: †R. xerophylla

Binomial name
- †Rhinella xerophylla Ponssa et al. 2022

Prehistoric species of toad

Rhinella xerophylla is an extinct species of toad in the genus Rhinella found in Argentina. It lived in the Pliocene period and inhabited tropical rainforests of South America.
