= McColley Canyon Formation =

Geologic formation in Nevada, United States

- Stratigraphic range: Devonian
- Type: Formation
- Sub-units: Kobeh Member, Bartine Member, and Coils Creek Limestone

Location
- Region: Nevada
- Country: United States

The McColley Canyon Formation is a geologic formation in Nevada. It preserves fossils dating back to the Devonian period.

== See also ==
- List of fossiliferous stratigraphic units in Nevada
- Paleontology in Nevada
