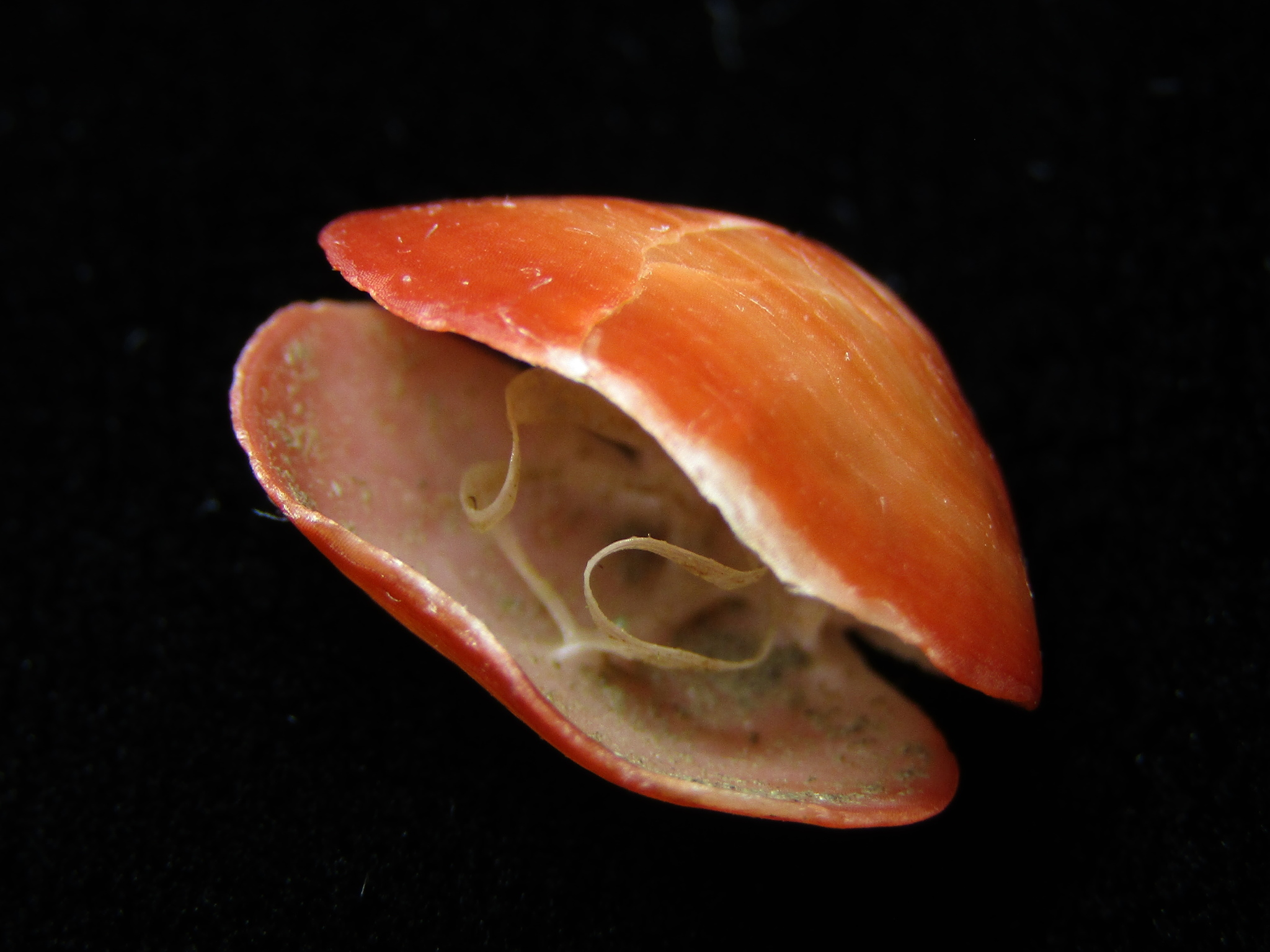
- Calloria inconspicua (New Zealand lampshell)

Scientific classification
- Domain: Eukaryota
- Kingdom: Animalia
- Phylum: Brachiopoda
- Class: Rhynchonellata
- Order: Terebratulida
- Family: Terebratellidae
- Genus: Calloria; Cooper & Lee, 1993

= Calloria (brachiopod) =

Genus of brachiopods

Calloria is a genus of brachiopods belonging to the family Terebratellidae.

The species of this genus are found in New Zealand.

Species:

- Calloria inconspicua (Sowerby, 1846)
- Calloria variegata Cooper & Doherty, 1993
