= Calyptocephalella sauzalensis =

Calyptocephalella sauzalensis Temporal range: Miocene

Scientific classification
- Kingdom: Animalia
- Phylum: Chordata
- Class: Amphibia
- Order: Anura
- Family: Calyptocephalellidae
- Genus: Calyptocephalella
- Species: †C. sauzalensis

Binomial name
- †Calyptocephalella sauzalensis Nicoli et al., 2022

Extinct species of frog

Calyptocephalella sauzalensis is an extinct species of frog in the genus Calyptocephalella that lived during the Miocene.

== Distribution ==
Calyptocephalella sauzalensis is known from the El Sauzal Formation of Argentina.
