= Timothy D. Herbert =

American oceanographer

Timothy Herbert
- Education: B.Sc. Yale College, Ph.D. Princeton University
- Scientific career
- Fields: Paleoclimatology, Paleoceanography
- Workplaces: Brown University
- Website: https://vivo.brown.edu/display/therbert

Timothy D. Herbert is an American oceanographer, currently the Henry L. Doherty Professor of Oceanography, Professor of Environmental Studies and Professor of Earth, Environmental and Planetary Sciences at Brown University. He obtained B.S. in the Geological Sciences from Yale College in 1980 and, seven years later, graduated with a Ph.D. in the same field from Princeton University.

He was elected as a Fellow of the American Association for the Advancement of Science in 2011 and American Geophysical Union in 2020.
