= Denay Limestone =

Geologic formation in Nevada, United States

- Stratigraphic range: Devonian
- Type: Formation
- Overlies: Coils Creek Limestone

Location
- Region: Nevada
- Country: United States

The Denay Limestone is a geologic formation in Nevada. It preserves fossils dating back to the Devonian period. It is located in the Denay Valley, which lies between the Simpson Park Mountains and the Roberts Mountains.

== See also ==
- List of fossiliferous stratigraphic units in Nevada
- Paleontology in Nevada
