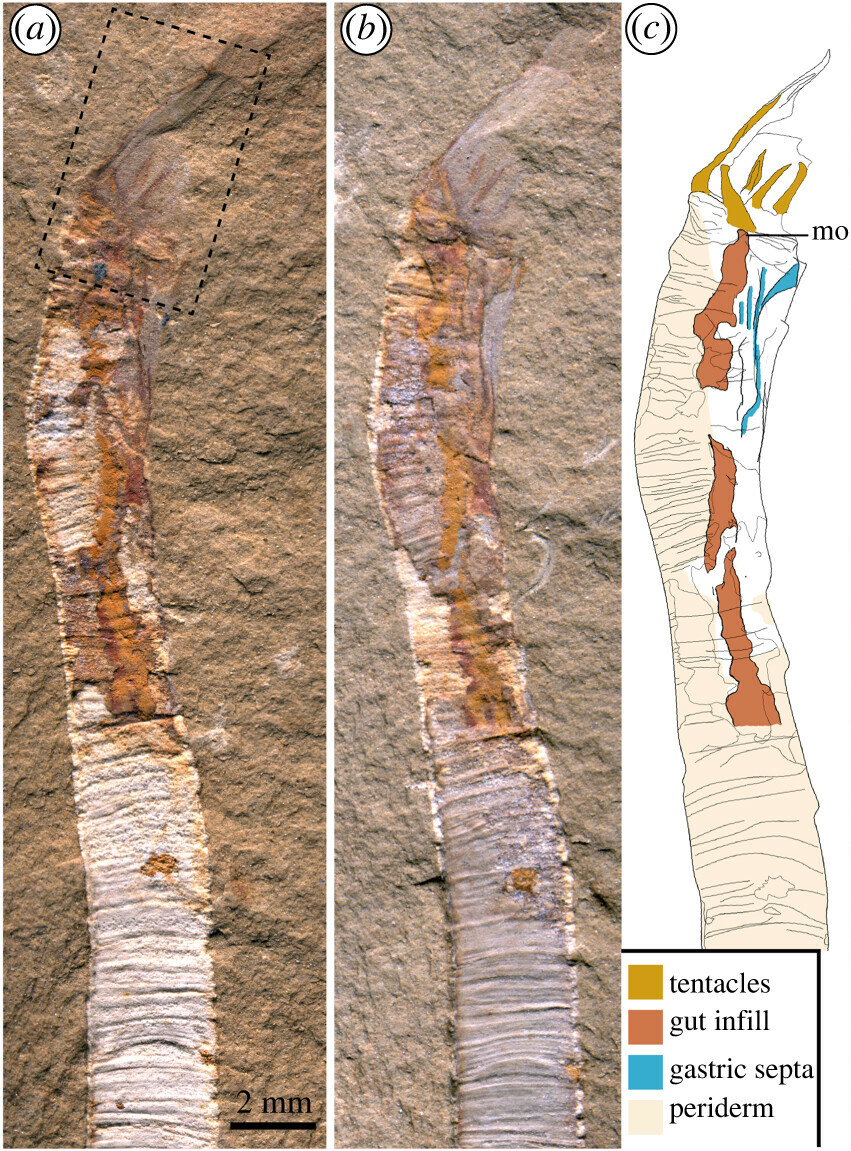

- Life restoration

Scientific classification
- Kingdom: Animalia
- Phylum: Cnidaria
- Genus: †Gangtoucunia
- Species: †G. aspera

Binomial name
- †Gangtoucunia aspera Luo & Hu 1999

= Gangtoucunia =

Gangtoucunia Temporal range: Cambrian Stage 4

Extinct genus of worms

Gangtoucunia is a genus of tube worm-like animals, known from the Cambrian aged Wulongqing Formation of Yunnan, China. While originally considered to be of uncertain affinites, specimens described in 2022 preserving the soft-tissue anatomy suggests that it was a cnidarian belonging to Medusozoa.
