= Laxifenestella =

Laxifenestella Temporal range: Devonian–Permian 412.3-254.0 myr

Scientific classification
- Kingdom: Animalia
- Phylum: Bryozoa
- Class: Stenolaemata
- Order: †Fenestrida
- Family: †Fenestellidae
- Genus: †Laxifenestella; Morozova, 1974

Type species
- Fenestella sarytshevae Shulga- Nesterenko, 1951

Diversity
- 11 species

Extinct genus of bryozoan

Laxifenestella is an extinct genus of bryozoans of the family Fenestellidae, found from the Devonian period to the Permian 412.3 to 254.0 million years ago. The genus colonies consist of a mesh of mostly straight branches in a fan-like or funnel-like shape. There are several species belonging to the Laxifenestella genus being L. borealis, L. texana, L. contracta, L. exserta, L. firma, L. morozova, L. lahuseni, L. oviferorsa, L. sarytshevae, L. stuchugorensis and L. stuckenbergi. Parent taxon of this genus is Fenestellidae with siste taxons being Alternifenestella, Minilya, Spinofenestella. Fossils of the laxifenestella genus in the permian period are found in Australia, Canada, Iran, Omen, Pakistan, and Russia. Fossils from the Carboniferous period are found in spain with Devonian period fossils being found in the Czech Republic. In total there are 22 fossils belonging to the Laxifenestella genus.
