= Sally Leys =

Canadian scientist specialising in sponges

Sally Leys (Sally Penelope Leys) is a Canadian spongiologist. She is a professor of biology at the University of Alberta where she and her colleagues study sponges in all their aspects including ecology, physiology, their adaptations to a fluid environment and the evolution of sensory systems using sponges as their model organism. A current project is Evaluating ecosystem function, vulnerability, resilience, and ability to recover from multiple stressors.

She earned a B.Sc. in 1990 from the University of British Columbia and a Ph.D from University of Victoria in 1996, entitled Cytoskeletal architecture, organelle transport, and impulse conduction in hexactinellid sponge syncytia, followed by post-doctoral work in Barbados, in Marseille, and at the University of Queensland.
