= Jessica Denay =

American author and lifestyle magazine founder

Jessica Denay is an author and the founder of the lifestyle magazine Hot Moms Club, which has a fan base of over 4.5 million people on Facebook.

== Career ==
Denay became a private tutor for the son of Keely and Pierce Brosnan during the filming of the movie Thomas Crown Affair in New York City. She relocated to Los Angeles to work for the Brosnans' full-time until 2005 when she founded the Hot Moms Club. She was joined by Joy Bergin, who works as a stylist. The original club had three members and created the name "as a joke," never expecting it to become part of a "movement." The Hot Mom's Club began to have a celebrity following. By 2009, there were 110,000 women involved in the online social network. The club provides online sources of information to mothers. The Hot Moms Club also has a line of fashion merchandise, including tanks and T-shirts.

In 2006, Buzznation and Medicis proposed a show called "Hottest Mom" and Denay became involved in a legal battle over a "brand she created."

The Hot Mom's Handbook includes "lightweight tips to new mothers." In the handbook, she advocates that it's important for mothers to love themselves as much as they love their children.

When Denay held a launch party for The Hot Mom to Be Handbook: Womb With a View, in 2008, celebrities Gwen Stefani, Melora Hardin and others were on site.

== Personal life ==
Denay was married to Days of Our Lives actor Bryan Dattilo (Lucas) in 1999; they divorced in 2001 and have one son, Gabriel.
