= Stenuroidea =

Stenuroidea Temporal range: Ordovician–Permian

Scientific classification
- Kingdom: Animalia
- Phylum: Echinodermata
- Subphylum: Asterozoa
- Order: †Stenuroidea; Blake, 2013

Extinct order of asterozoan echinoderms

Stenuroidea is an extinct order of asterozoan echinoderms first defined at ordinal level in 1951 by W. K. Spencer, and later raised to class level in 2013.

The order is restricted from the Ordovician to the Permian with their first appearance in the fossil record being in the Early Ordovician (Tremadocian - Floian).

== Characteristics ==
Stenuroids have two to four rod-like "virgal ossicles", while somasteroids have a series of them. In the derived orders Asteroidea and Ophiuroidea the virgal series is reduced to a single ossicle.

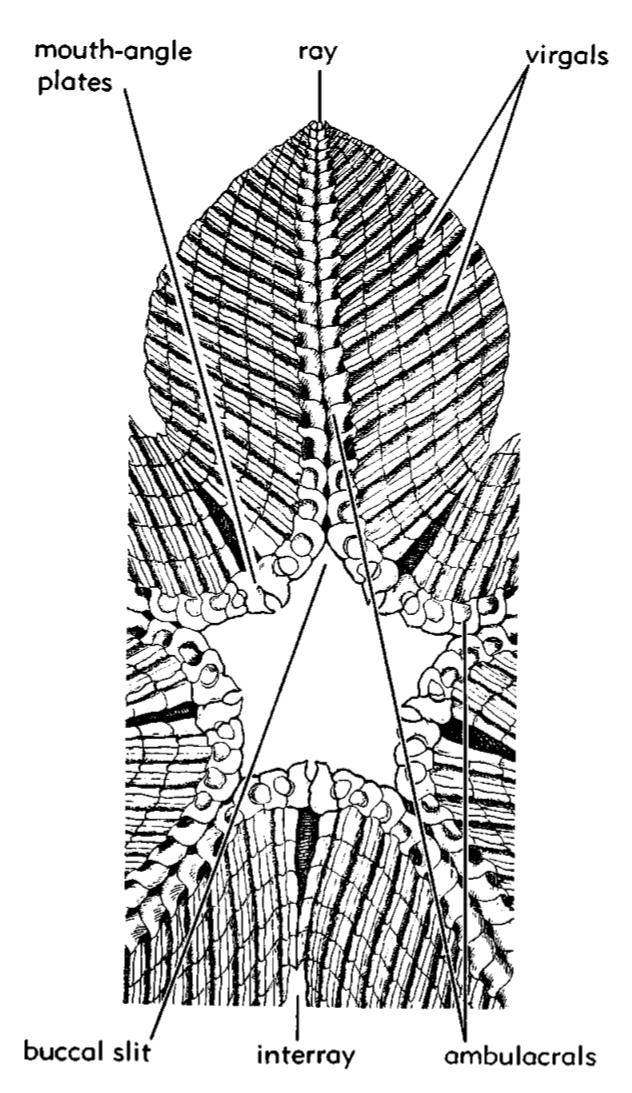
Villebrunaster thorali (Somasteroidea)

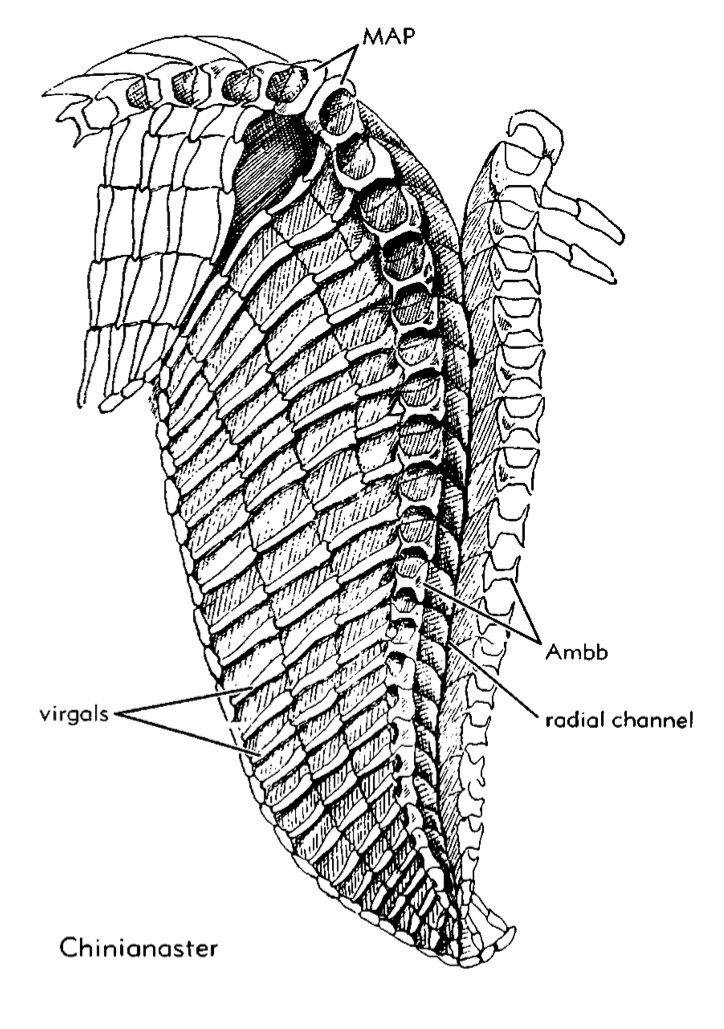
Chiniaster (Somasteroidea)

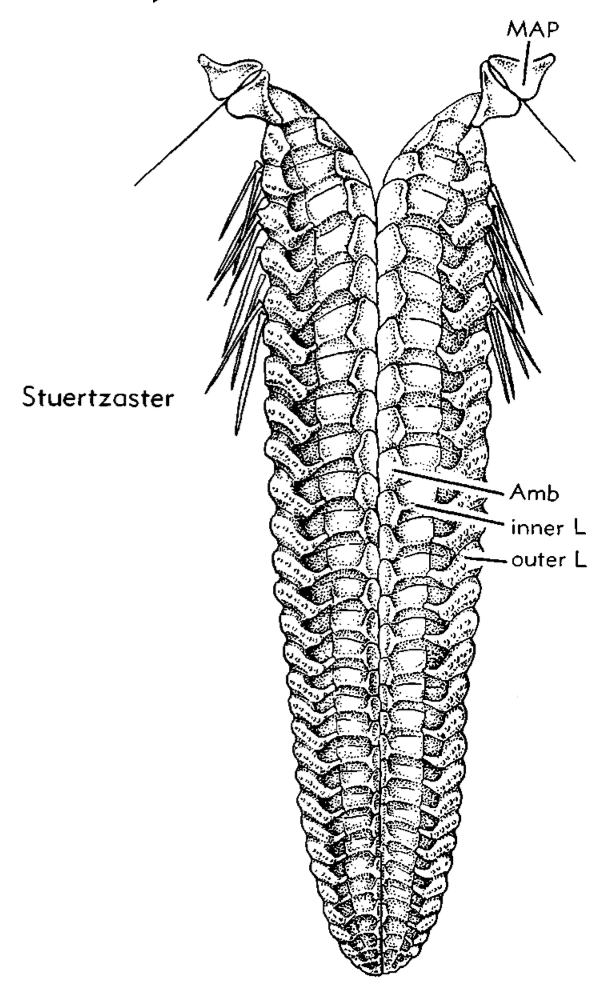
Stuertzaster (Stenuroidea)

Differences in virgals between somasteroids and stenuroids; note that in somasteroids the number of virgals per ambulacral varies based on the width of the arm, while the number of virgals (labeled as inner and outer laterals) in stenuroids is the same along the entire length of the arm.
