= Flo, Sweden =

Historic parish (socken) in Swedish

Coordinates: 58.33524°N 12.567978°E

Flo Parish Flo socken
- Parish (socken)
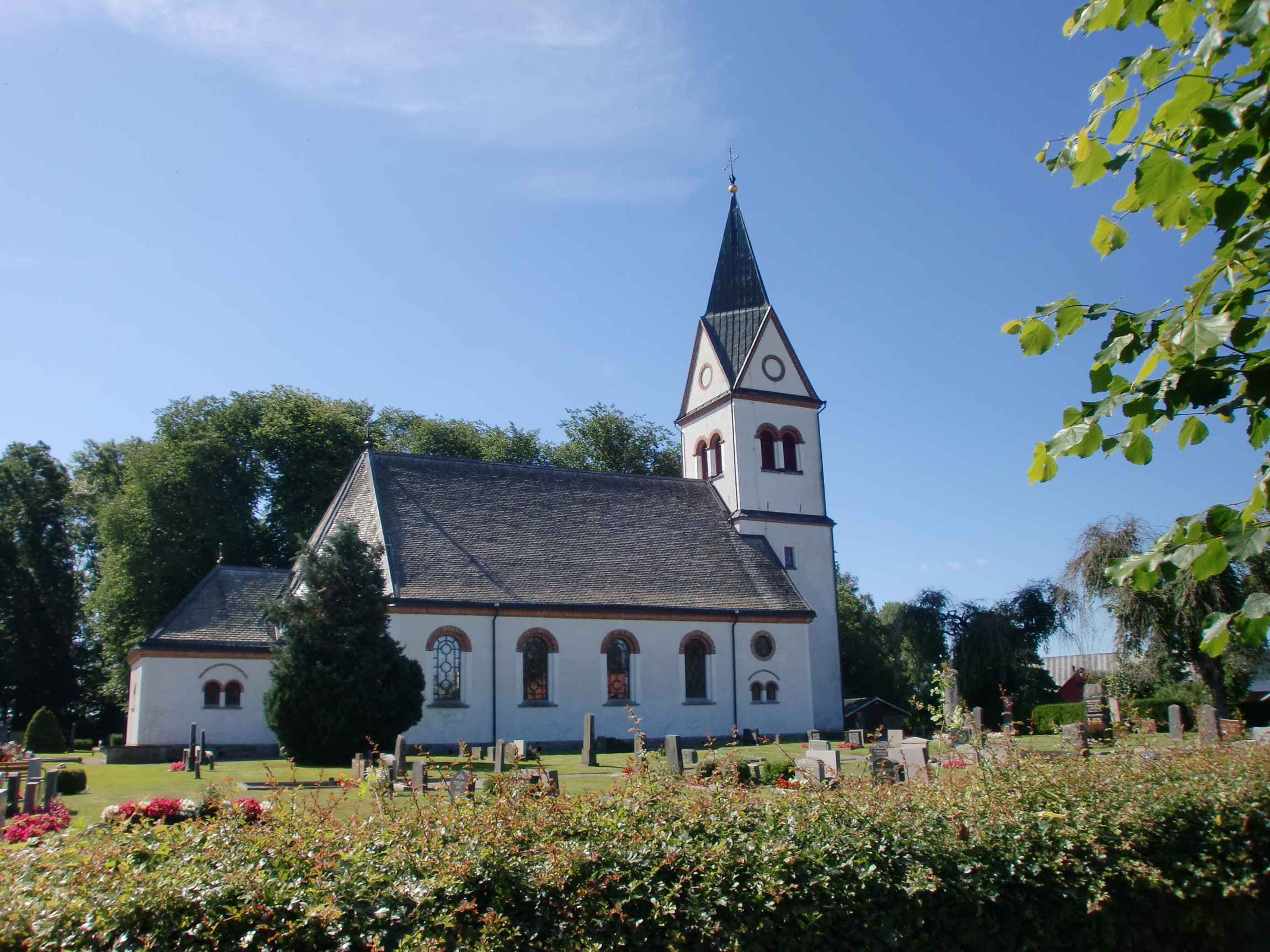
- Flo Church
- Interactive map of Flo Parish

Area
  - Total: 64.08 km^{2} (24.74 sq mi)

Population (2000)
  - Total: 434

Flo (Swedish: Flo socken) is a historic parish (socken) in the Swedish province of Västergötland. Since 1971 it has been a part of Grästorp Municipality.

== Geology ==
Flo parish is the namesake for the Floian stage, which is the second stage of the Lower Ordovician. The base of the Floian is defined at the Diabasbrottet quarry type section (GSSP) 5 km to the northwest of Flo. The base is defined in the quarry as the lowest stratigraphic occurrence of the graptolite species Tetragraptus approximatus.
