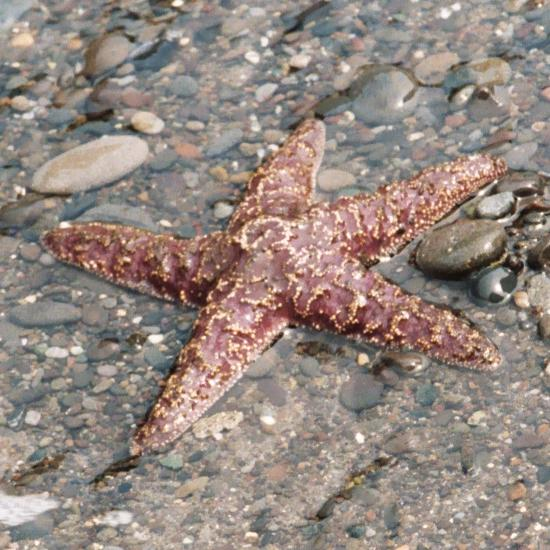
- Ochre sea star on beach at Olympic National Park

Scientific classification
- Kingdom: Animalia
- Phylum: Echinodermata
- Superclass: Stelleroidea; Lamarck, 1816 [nom. transl. et correct. Gregory, 1900 (pro les Stellerides Lamarck, 1816)]

Classes
- Asteroidea; Ophiuroidea; Somasteroidea †

= Stelleroidea =

Class of marine invertebrates

Stelleroidea is a junior synonym of Asterozoa.

== History ==
In 1900, Stelleroidea was included as a class in F. A. Bather's echinoderm taxonomy, which grouped Asteroidea and Ophiuroidea within it as subclasses due to their Paleozoic history. In 1966, the Treatise on Invertebrate Paleontology included Stelleroidea as the only class within the subphylum Asterozoa, with Somasteroidea, Asteroidea, and Ophiuroidea as subclasses. By a 1980 revision of the Treatise's taxonomy, Asteroidea and Ophiuroidea had been promoted to classes in place of Stelleroidea.
