= Geology of Laos =

The geology of Laos includes poorly defined oldest rocks. Marine conditions persisted for much of the Paleozoic and parts of the Mesozoic, followed by periods of uplift and erosion. The country has extensive salt, gypsum and potash, but very little hydrocarbons and limited base metals.

== Geologic history, stratigraphy and tectonics ==
The Precambrian and Paleozoic are poorly attested in the Laotian rock record. Some areas in the northwest, northeast and southeast are believed to have high-grade metamorphic rocks from the Proterozoic. No Cambrian rocks have been verified, although some may be represented by metasedimentary rocks underlying Ordovician strata. Shale with graptolite fossils in the northeast belong to the Early Ordovician. Marines sedimentation took place during the Ordovician, Silurian and Devonian. Continuous sedimentation went on in the east into the Carboniferous, but elsewhere a marine regression brought erosion. The Permian and Carboniferous brought renewed marine deposition of sandstone, shale and limestone as well as some terrestrial deposits like coal found near Vientiane and Saravane. The limestone forms a prominent karst topography in the north and east.

=== Mesozoic (251-66 million years ago) ===
Marine sedimentation only continued in a few sedimentary basins during the Triassic at the start of the Mesozoic, such as the Sam Neua area. Volcanic rocks that erupted primarily in the Permian, but into the Triassic are situated in northern Laos in the Pak Lay-Luang Prabang area and northwest to the border with Myanmar. They correlate with similar rocks in Thailand inferred to be the result of subduction-related volcanism. Dacite and rhyolite are common in the Sam Neua area while rhyolite and tuff covers much of the Sekong Valley and along the Cambodian border in the south.

Almost all Jurassic and Cretaceous rocks are terrestrial, except for marine rocks in the southern Sekong Valley from the Early Jurassic. A mountainous terrane formed due to Triassic uplift, which brought intense erosion. By the Middle Cretaceous, the land surface was heavily worn down leaving silt, clay and mud interspersed with evaporites, which underlie the plains around Vientiane and east of Savannakhet.

=== Cenozoic (66 million years ago-present) ===
Paleogene deposits from the Cenozoic are absent in Laos, but Neogene freshwater sediments settled in small valleys between mountain ranges, made up of shale, sandstone, marl and lignite. Because of a lack of coarse sediments which typically erode off of steep neighboring mountains, geologists have interpreted these basins as the down-dropped remnants of older, wider basins. Highlands uplifted during the Pliocene and Pleistocene and immediately experienced intense erosion. The Plain of Jars has extensive gravel and silt terraces from the Quaternary, including loess and volcanic ash. The Mekong River which transported the eroded material may have followed a different course because sediments are primarily shallow and Holocene in age beneath the present course of the river. Thick basalt lavas extruded onto Mesozoic sandstone at the Bolovens Plateau east of Pakse during the Pleistocene.

=== Tectonics ===
The Truong Son and Luang Prabang structures converge in northern Laos, bordered by northwest trending fault-bounded structures such as Phu Hoat Massif. The Song Ma Anticlinorium near Vietnam exposes Proterozoic basement rock at the surface. The Yunnan-Malay fold belt originated from closure of two sedimentary basins and is a prominent feature. Only a few major intrusions are known such as Early Triassic granodiorite near Pak Lay and gabbro near Sayaboury.

== Natural resource geology ==
Laos has small amounts of tin, gypsum, limestone and coal and previously has alluvial sapphire, copper and salt mining. The country has extensive salt and gypsum deposits as well as potash near Vientiane, possible bauxite on the Bolovens Plateau and some iron deposits. Laterite deposits contain some cassiterite.
