= Paratetragraptus =

Paratetragraptus Temporal range: Early Floian
- Fossil of Paratetragraptus approximatus

Scientific classification
- Kingdom: Animalia
- Phylum: Hemichordata
- Class: Pterobranchia
- Subclass: Graptolithina
- Order: †Graptoloidea
- Suborder: †Dichograptina
- Family: †Phyllograptidae
- Genus: †Paratetragraptus; Obut, 1957

Type species
- †Tetragraptus approximatus Nicholson, 1873

Species
- †Paratetragraptus approximatus (Nicholson, 1873); †P. vestrogothus (Törnquist, 1904); †P. acclinans (Keble, 1920); †P. thomassmithi VandenBerg, 2017; †P? henrywilliamsi VandenBerg, 2017

Synonyms
- Synonyms of P. approximatus: †Tetragraptus (Etagraptus) quebecensis Ruedemann & Laverdière, 1935; †Tetragraptus (Etagraptus) lavalensis Ruedemann & Laverdière, 1935; †Tetragraptus volitans Harris and Thomas, 1938; †Tetragraptus (Etagraptus) pacificus Ruedemann, 1947; †Tetragraptus (Etagraptus) putillus Ruedemann, 1947; †Tetragraptus (Etagraptus) scandens Ruedemann, 1947; †Tetragraptus (Etagraptus) minor Chen in Chen et al., 1983; ?†Tetragraptus (Etagraptus) prionodus Xu and Huang, 1979; ?†Tetragraptus approximatus robustus William and Stevens, 1988; Synonyms of P. vestrogothus: ?†Tetragraptus (Etagraptus) laverdieri Ruedemann, 1937; †Tetragraptus (Paratetragraptus) akzharensis Tzaj, 1968

Genus of graptolite

Paratetragraptus is a genus of phyllograptid graptolite that lived in the early Floian (from the P. approximatus to Tshallograptus fructicosus zones worldwide). It can be distinguished from related genera by the roughly parallel orientation of its stipes and mostly horizontal tubarium, which makes it appear H- or X- shaped in dorsoventral view, and by the slightly declined proximal end.

The type species P. approximatus was first described by H. A. Nicholson as a species of Tetragraptus in 1873 and was assigned to the subgenera T. (Etagraptus) and T. (Eotetragraptus) before the subgenus T. (Paratetragraptus) was named in 1957 by A. M. Obut. P. approximatus lived in the epipelagic zone and was a cosmopolitan species that first appears at roughly the same time worldwide, and as a result, its first appearance datum is used as the definition for the base of the Floian.

== History ==
The type species of Paratetragraptus, P. approximatus, was first described by Henry Alleyne Nicholson as Tetragraptus approximatus in his 1873 paper On some fossils from the Quebec group of Point Lévis, Quebec. Rudolf Ruedemann included T. approximatus in his subgenus Tetragraptus (Etagraptus), which he named, based on the type species Tetragraptus (Etagraptus) lentus, to encompass "Horizontal species in which the second order branches form with the funicle the letter H," and named several new species that would turn out to be synonyms of P. approximatus. In 1951, the Czech paleontologists Bedřich Bouček and Alois Přibyl included T. approximatus in their subgenus Tetragraptus (Eotetragraptus), based on the type species Tetragraptus quadribrachiatus, and divided the subgenus into species with X-shaped tubaria and species with H-shaped tubaria.

In 1957, the Russian paleontologist Aleksandr Mikhaĭlovich Obut named the subgenus Paratetragraptus based on Tetragraptus approximatus and related graptolites with H-shaped tubaria (but excluding Tetragraptus lentus) but did not describe the genus, instead referring to Bouček and Přibyl's discussion of T. approximatus. Henry S. Williams and Robert K. Stevens, in their 1988 paper on graptolites from the Cow Head Group of Newfoundland, described for the first time the proximal development of Tetragraptus approximatus and considered Paratetragraptus an invalid subgenus, as the proximal development of T. approximatus was identical to that of Tetragraptus sensu stricto and the orientation of the stipes in Tetragraptus was variable.

Alfons H.M. VandenBerg's 2018 paper revising the early Floian stratigraphy of Victoria, Australia resurrected Paratetragraptus and elevated it to the rank of genus based on the declined funicle and deflexed second-order stipes. Jörg Maletz accepted the genus in both the Second Revision of the Treatise on Invertebrate Paleontology volume on graptolites and in his 2023 paper on the Lower Ordovician graptolites of the Diabasbrottet quarry in Sweden, and modified the definition to include the parallel-oriented second-order stipes.

== Description ==
Paratetragraptus is a genus of phyllograptid with four second-order stipes (branches) that are mostly horizontal with respect to the sicula. The four stipes are connected by a 'bridge' called the funicle, which is formed by the first two thecae (thecae 1^{1} and 1^{2}). Its differences from true Tetragraptus are minor, but the most prominent are the paired, roughly parallel-oriented stipes which result in an H- shaped tubarium (as in the type species P. approximatus) when they are parallel throughout or X-shaped tubarium (as in P. vestrogothus and P. acclinans) when they are more spread out. The apparent width of the stipes on either side of the funicle can differ, which suggests that the stipes were oval in cross-section. The thecae are typical 'dichograptid' thecae, being simple tubes that curve outwards and widen considerably close to the thecal apertures.

Unlike Tetragraptus, the funicle of Paratetragraptus is slightly declined, as the two thecae of the funicle hang slightly below the sicula. In P. approximatus, the thecae of the funicle are angled at between 90 and 118 degrees with respect to each other. The proximal (earliest) portions of the stipes are also declined (with an angle between stipes from 86 to 118 degrees in P. approximatus), but the stipes curve dorsally and become horizontal for most of their length. Most mature specimens are preserved in dorsoventral view, creating the appearance of a flat, H- or X- shaped tubarium and hiding the three-dimensional form of the tubarium. The declined nature of the funicle and early portions of the stipes can only be seen in rare specimens preserved in lateral view, and in those specimens the proximal region of the tubarium forms a small 'peak' above the horizontal region of the stipes that is composed of the sicula and funicle.

Paratetragraptus approximatus in lateral view showing slightly deflexed (ventrally angled) stipes proximally (the 'peak' in the center) becoming roughly horizontal distally.

X-shaped tubarium of Paratetragraptus vestrogothus showing curved stipes becoming roughly parallel distally.

The proximal development is well known from Paratetragraptus based on flattened, isolated material from the Cow Head Group of Newfoundland and is similar to that of Tetragraptus. The sicula in P. approximatus is conical and between 2.0 and 2.2 mm long, with a prosicula between 0.3 and 0.35 mm. The sicular aperture is adorned with a tongue-like rutellum on its ventral side. The first theca, theca 1^{1} (th1^{1}), originates low from the prosicula and gives rise to theca 1^{2} (th1^{2}), which grows down and across the sicula. Th1^{2} is the first dicalycal theca, giving Paratetragraptus isograptid proximal development, and produces th2^{1} (which grows across the sicula towards th1^{1}) and th2^{2} (which grows away from the sicula). The four stipes are formed by dicalycal thecae at th3^{1} (which buds from th2^{1}) and th3^{2} (which buds from th2^{2}).

A few specimens of Paratetragraptus approximatus and P. vestrogothus from the Diabassbrottet section show a web-like structure around the proximal region. The webs in P. approximatus are small and form a rim around the funicle, but the webs in P. vestrogothus are much more expansive. Several large specimens of P. vestrogothus lack a proximal web, suggesting that it was only developed in extremely old (gerontic) specimens. A single expansive, but poorly preserved, proximal web is also present in a specimen of P. acclinans from Australia.

Proximal webs in Paratetragraptus approximatus (left) and P. vestrogothus (right)

=== Species ===
Paratetragraptus approximatus (historically known as Tetragraptus approximatus) is a highly variable species, and juveniles appear very different from mature specimens due to both compaction and due to the thicker stipes in adults. As a result, several species have been named from the lower Floian (for instance, by Ruedemann and Laverdière, 1935 and Ruedemann, 1947) that are in fact juveniles of P. approximatus.

Williams and Stevens (1988) named the subspecies Tetragraptus approximatus robustus, but Mu et al. (2002) noted that it was identical to the earlier species Tetragraptus (Etagraptus) prionodus Xu and Huang, 1979, which they made a subspecies of T. approximatus. Maletz (2023) suggested that it was unclear whether T. a. robustus was a separate subspecies or simply an intraspecific variant of P. approximatus and tentatively synonymized the two.

Valid species following Williams and Stevens (1988), Mu et al. (2002), VandenBerg (2017), and Maletz (2023): (Note: This may not represent all valid species.)

- Type species †Paratetragraptus approximatus (Nicholson, 1873), originally Tetragraptus approximatus Nicholson, 1873
- †Paratetragraptus vestrogothus (Törnquist, 1904), originally Tetragraptus vestrogothus Törnquist, 1904
- †Paratetragraptus acclinans (Keble, 1920), originally Tetragraptus acclinans Keble, 1920
- †Paratetragraptus thomassmithi VandenBerg, 2017
- †Paratetragraptus? henrywilliamsi VandenBerg, 2017

Comparison between species
Species	Tubarium shape	Lateral stipe width	Thecal count	Thecal inclination	Sicula length	Funicle length	Age
Paratetragraptus approximatus	H-shaped	0.8–1.2 mm proximally, 2.0 mm distally	10 in 10 mm proximally, 7 in 10 mm distally	20–40°	2.0–2.2 mm	2.0–3.5mm	Tetragraptus phyllograptoides–Baltograptus vacillans zones
Paratetragraptus vestrogothus	X-shaped	1.5–1.6 mm distally		35–40°	2.5–2.8 mm	2.5–3.0 mm	Expansograptus protobalticus–Baltograptus vacillans zones
Paratetragraptus acclinans	X-shaped	1.8–2.0 mm distally	9 in 10 mm	45°		2.1–4.5 mm	upper P. approximatus–P. akzharensis zones
Paratetragraptus thomassmithi	H- or X- shaped	0.5–0.9 mm proximally, 1.3–1.4 mm distally	8–9 in 10 mm proximally, 6–7 in 10 mm distally	40–55°	2.8 mm	1.8–3.2 mm	La3 (P. approximatus)–Be1 (P. approximatus + Tshallograptus fructicosus) zones
Paratetragraptus? henrywilliamsi	X-shaped	0.8–1.0 mm proximally, 1.1–1.3 mm distally		35–40°	1.6–1.7 mm	2.6–3.0 mm	La3 (P. approximatus)–Be1 (P. approximatus + Tshallograptus fructicosus) zones

== Paleoenvironment and distribution ==
Paratetragraptus approximatus is a cosmopolitan species (though it was initially considered to be restricted to the low-latitude 'Pacific' faunal province before specimens were found in Europe), as it is distributed worldwide, and is a characteristic member of the Floian pandemic fauna at Hunneberg. P. approximatus resided in the epipelagic zone and was thus part of the epipelagic biotope, which is characterized by an abundance of phyllograptids, horizontal didymograptids (like Expansograptus), and axonophorans along with an absence of isograptids, sigmagraptids, and sinograptids. P. approximatus is rare in continental shelf environments and only appears sporadically, but is more consistently present in deeper-water shelf environments. In Scandinavian sequences, P. approximatus can be a dominant species in some geological horizons, but is also often absent for long stratigraphic intervals.

== Biostratigraphy ==
The base of the Floian Stage (477.08 Ma) is defined by the International Commission on Stratigraphy by the first appearance datum of Paratetragraptus approximatus at the Diabasbrottet Quarry in Västergötland, Sweden. P. approximatus is a morphologically distinctive and cosmopolitan species that first appears at roughly the same time in most stratigraphic sequences, making it a useful index fossil to identify the base of the Floian globally. However, it is a long-ranging species (extending from the earliest Floian Tetragraptus phyllograptoides zone to the Baltograptus vacillus zone in Scandinavia), limiting its use in defining individual biozones.

The first appearance datum of P. approximatus coincides with the base of the Tetragraptus phyllograptoides biozone in the Diabasbrottet section. In addition, the FAD of P. approximatus is just above the bases of both the Megistaspis (P.) planilimbata trilobite zone and the Oelandodus elongatus–Acodus deltatus deltatus subzone of the Paroistodus proteus conodont zone in the Diabasbrottet section, allowing the base of the Floian to be recognized even in sections lacking graptolites.

Paratetragraptus akzharensis (a junior synonym of P. vestrogothus) has been used as an index fossil for the P. akzharensis biozone, which occurs above the earliest Floian P. approximatus zone in Newfoundland and above the T. phyllograptoides zone, which is of similar age to the P. approximatus zone, in South America. An 'explosion' in diversity occurs in the P. akzharensis zone in Newfoundland, with the origination of several species as well as the continuation of nearly all species from the earlier P. approximatus zone. However, the characteristic fauna of the P. approximatus and P. akzharensis zones in Newfoundland largely went extinct in the succeeding Tshallograptus fructicosus zone. A peak in diversity is also known from the P. akzharensis zone in South America along with a reduction in diversity at the boundary with the succeeding Baltograptus cf. deflexus zone, though the decline may be associated with the lack of thoroughly-sampled stratigraphic sections at the zonal boundary.
