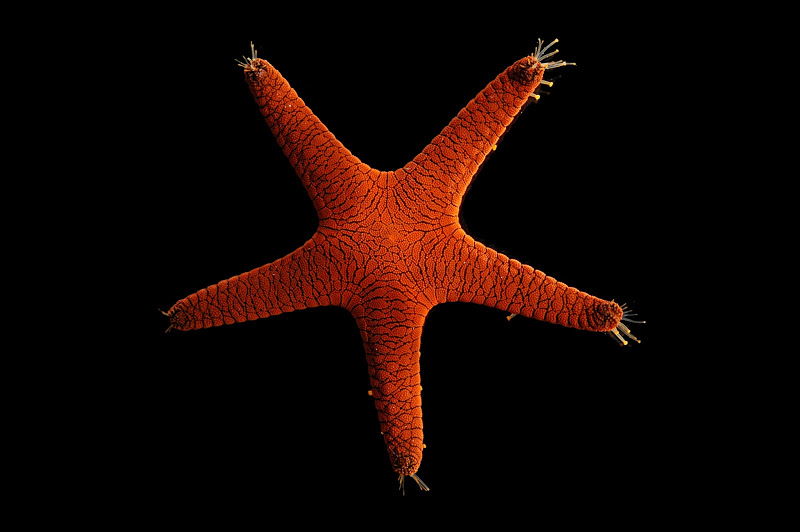
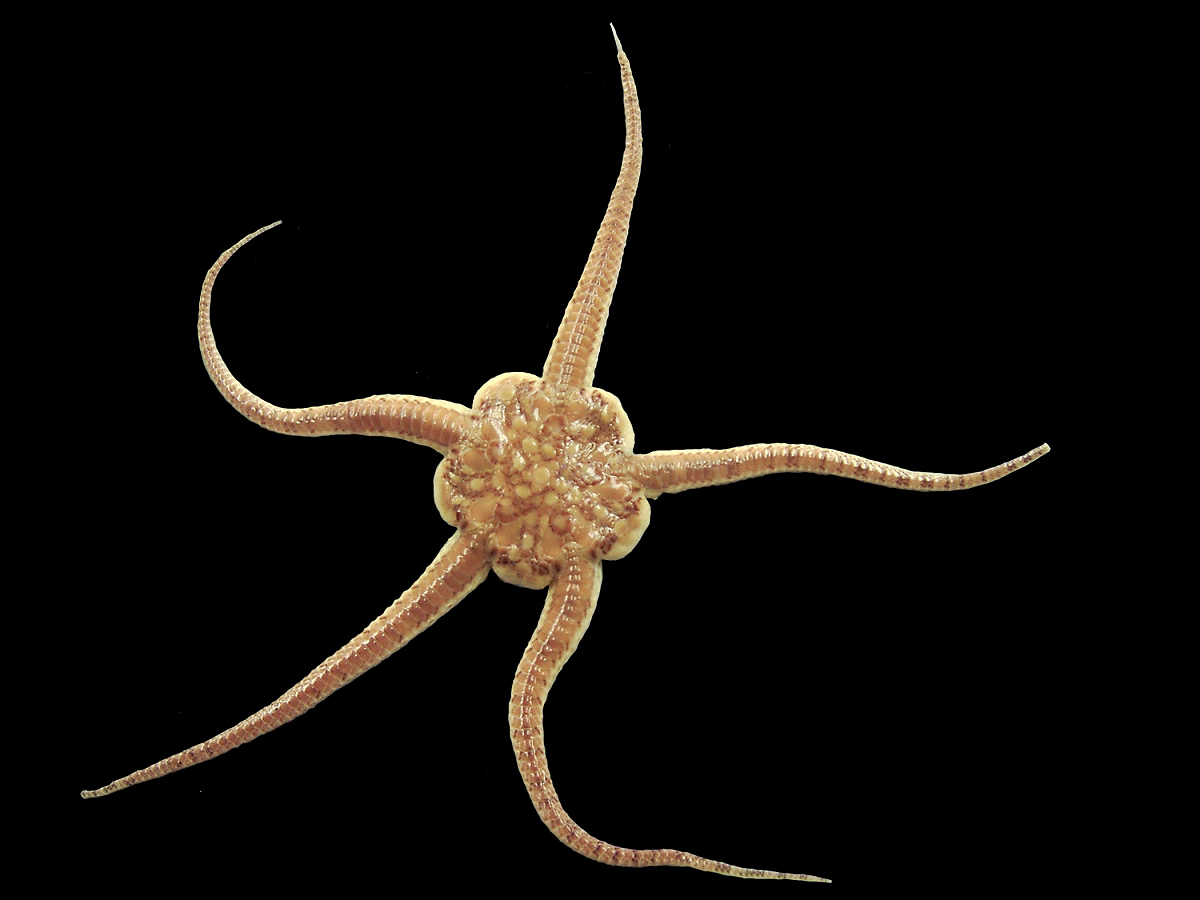
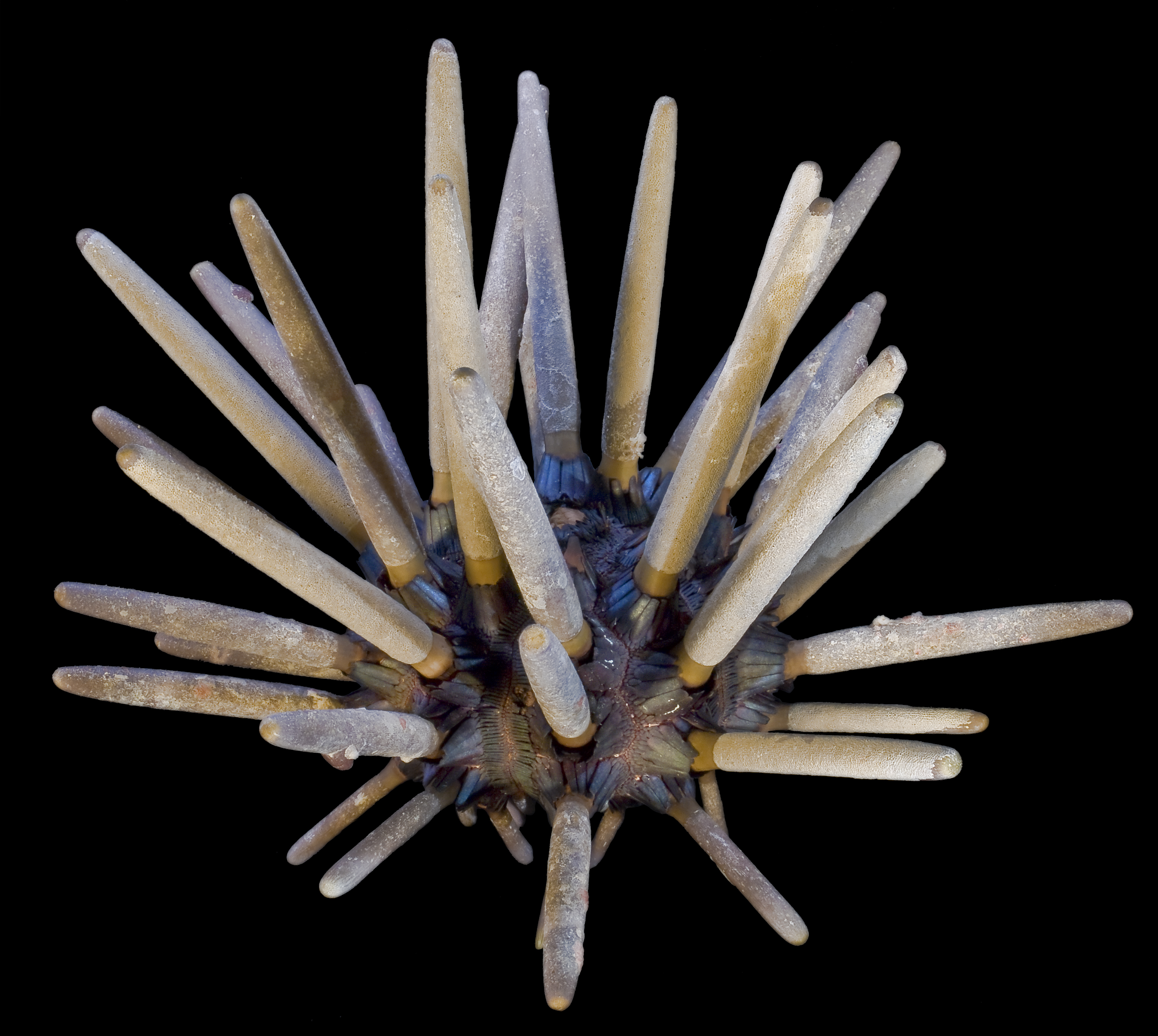
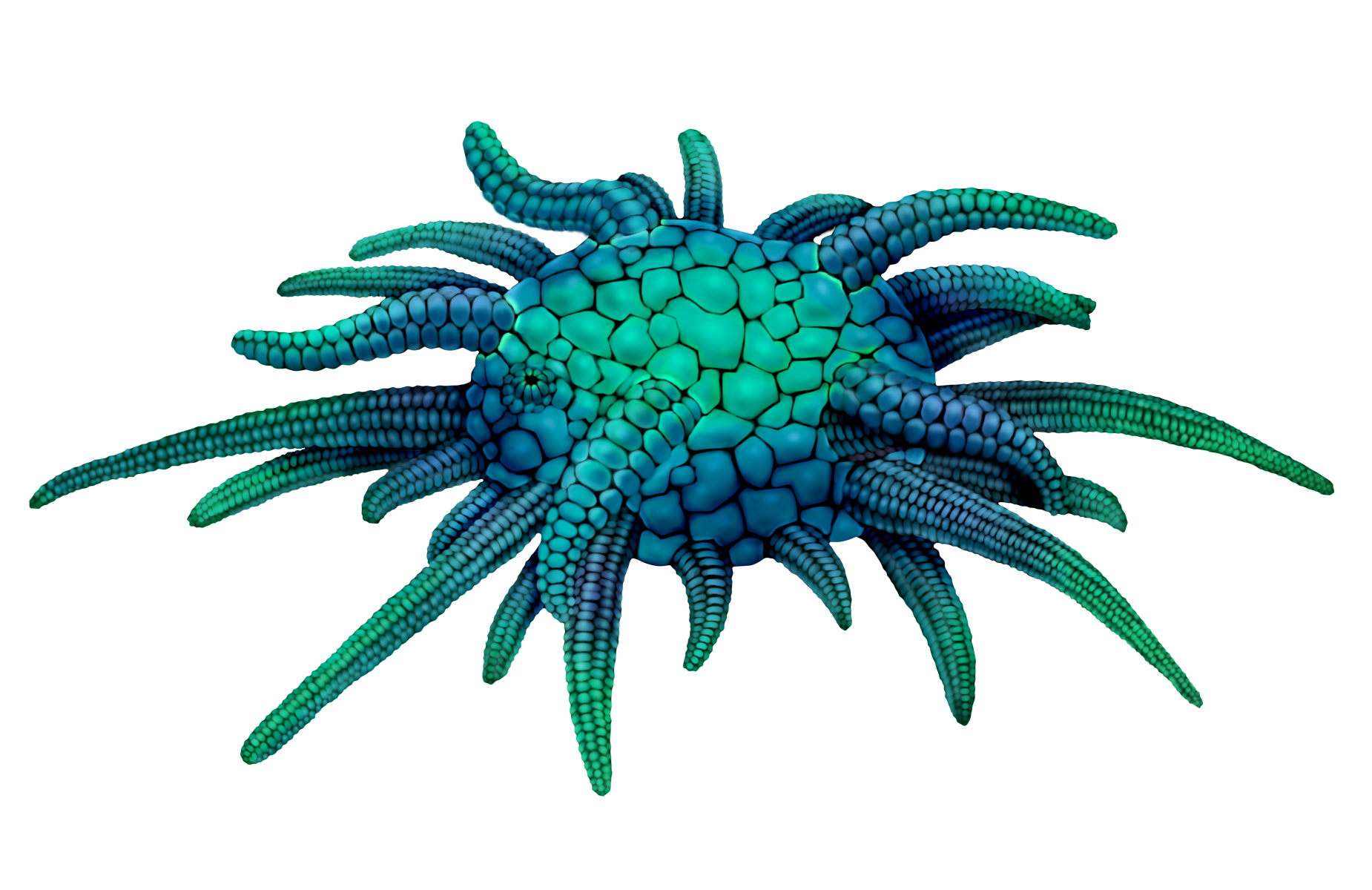
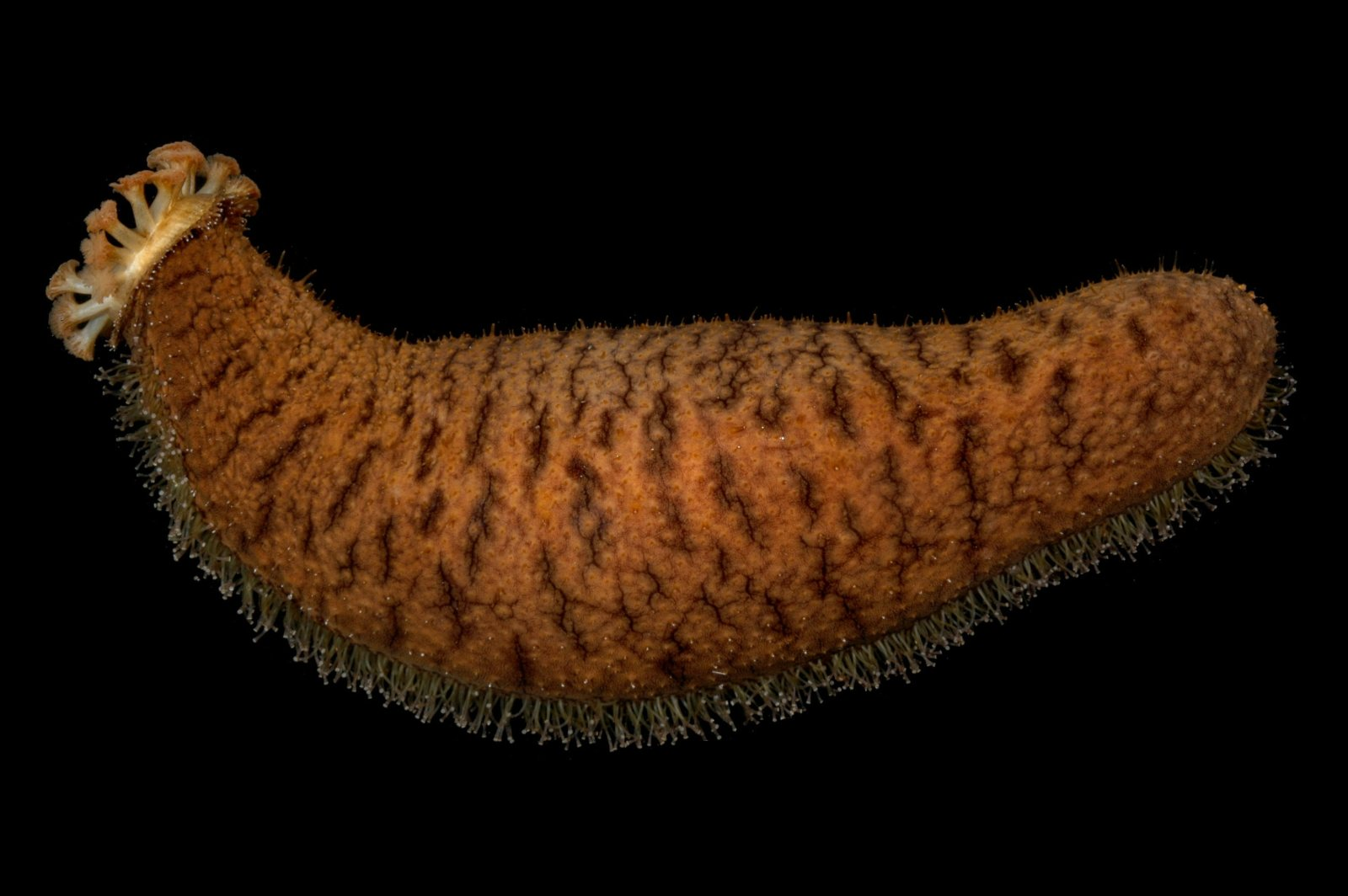
- Fromia indica (Asteroidea) Ophiura ophiura (Ophiuroidea) Phyllacanthus imperialis (Echinoidea) Sollasina cthulu † (Ophiocistioidea †) Actinopyga echinites (Holothuroidea)

Scientific classification
- Kingdom: Animalia
- Phylum: Echinodermata
- Subphylum: Eleutherozoa; Bell, 1891

Classes
- Subphylum Asterozoa; Class †Somasteroidea; Class Asteroidea; Class †Stenuroidea; Class Ophiuroidea; Subphylum Echinozoa; Class Echinoidea; Class †Ophiocistioidea; Class Holothuroidea

= Eleutherozoa =

Eleutherozoa Temporal range: Ordovician – Recent

Clade of echinoderms

Eleutherozoa is a subphylum of echinoderms. They are mobile animals with the mouth directed towards the substrate. They usually have a madreporite, tube feet, and moveable spines of some sort. It includes all living echinoderms except for crinoids. The monophyly of Eleutherozoa has been proven sufficiently well to be considered "uncontroversial."

== Etymology ==
From Ancient Greek ἐλεύθερος (eleútheros, "free") + ζῷον (zôion, "animal"), meaning "animal that moves freely."

== Classification ==
=== History ===
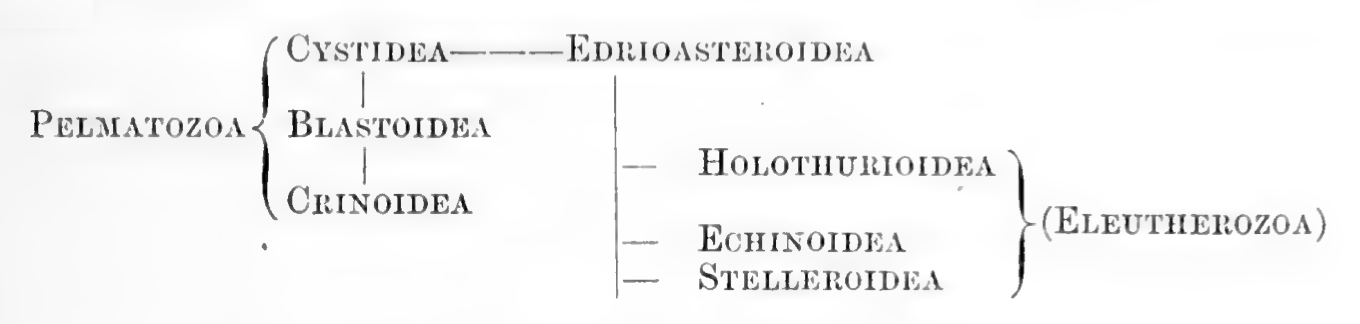
F. A. Bather's diagram of Echinoderm phylogeny from A Treatise on Zoology, Part III: The Echinoderma (1900)

Originally defined by F. J. Bell in a sense that excluded Holothuroidea, Eleutherozoa was expanded by F. A. Bather in his 1900 taxonomy to include all free-living echinoderms. Bather considered the taxa within Eleutherozoa to have descended from the other subphylum in his two-subphylum system, the Pelmatozoa, either from different subgroups or at "widely different periods." In cladistic terms, this would make Eleutherozoa a polyphyletic group.

In 1966–7, the Treatise on Invertebrate Paleontology adopted a four-subphylum system to replace Bather's system, in part because of the belief that Eleutherozoa was polyphyletic, although it retained "pelmatozoic" and "eleutherozoic" as descriptions of attached and free-living modes of life, respectively. This classification introduced Asterozoa and Echinozoa as subphyla. However, this version of Echinozoa was much more expansive than its modern sense, and included all non-stalked classes that were assigned to neither Asterozoa nor Homalozoa.

With the advent of cladistics, the taxonomy of echinoderms was re-evaluated, finding new support for both Pelmatozoa (in its original sense, per Leuckart, encompassing only stalked forms) and Eleutherozoa, with Echinozoa now having its modern contents of Echinoidea as the sister to a clade containing Holothuroidea and the extinct (and possibly paraphyletic) Ophiocistioidea. However, Edrioasteroidea was also included in this version of Eleutherozoa.

==== Asterozoa vs Cryptosyringida ====
- Echinodermata
  - Pelmatozoa
    - Crinoidea
    - Cystoidea (=Blastozoa) †
  - Camptostroma †
  - Eleutherozoa
    - Edrioasteroidea †
    - - Asteroidea
      - Cryptosyringida
        - Ophiuroidea
        - Echinozoa
          - Echinoidea
          - - Ophiocistioidea †
            - Holothuroidea

An obsolete cladogram based on Smith (1984) showing the now-disproven Cryptosyringida hypothesis

While this initially restored Eleutherozoa as a monophyletic clade and defined the modern scope of Echinozoa, it followed embryological evidence grouping Ophiuroidea with Echinozoa. This clade, as sister to the Asteroidea, was given the name Cryptosyringida, constructed from the Greek "kryptos" (hidden) and "syringos" (pipe or fistula), referring to the hiding of certain anatomical elements during development.

More recent work has shown, through multiple lines of evidence, that Asterozoa, consisting of the classes Asteroidea and Ophiuroidea, is the sister group of Echinozoa within Eleutherozoa, disproving the Cryptosyringida hypothesis. As of 2024, the emerging consensus regarding echinoderm phylogeny restricts Eleutherozoa to Asterozoa plus Echinozoa, but has not fully resolved the nature of Eleutherozoa's relationship to Edrioasteroidea.

=== Phylogeny ===
The living clades of echinoderms are related to each other as follows:

- Echinodermata
  - Crinoidea
  - Eleutherozoa
    - Echinozoa
      - Holothuroidea sea cucumbers
      - Echinoidea sea urchins
    - Asterozoa
      - Ophiuroidea brittle stars
      - Asteroidea starfish

== Footnotes ==
=== Works cited ===
- Bather, F. A. (1900). "Chapter VIII: General Description of the Echinoderma". In Lankester, E. Ray (ed.). A Treatise on Zoology, Part III: The Echinoderma. London: Adam & Charles Black. pp. 1–37. doi:10.1080/00222930008678384.
- Bell, F. J. (1891). "On the arrangement and inter-relations of the classes of the Echinodermata". The Annals and Magazine of Natural History. 8 (45): 206–215. doi:10.1080/00222939109460422.
- Blake, Andrew B.; Hotchkiss, Frederick H.C. (2022). "Origin of the subphylum Asterozoa and redescription of a Moroccan Ordovician somasteroid". Geobios. 72–73: 22–36. doi:10.1016/j.geobios.2022.07.002.
- David, Bruno; Mooi, Rich (January 1999). "Contributions of the extraxial-axial theory to understanding the echinoderms". Bulletin de la Société Géologique de France. 170 (1): 91–101.
- Escriva, Hector; Reich, Adrian; Dunn, Casey; Akasaka, Koji; Wessel, Gary (2015). "Phylogenomic Analyses of Echinodermata Support the Sister Groups of Asterozoa and Echinozoa". PLOS ONE. 10 (3) e0119627. Bibcode:2015PLoSO..1019627R. doi:10.1371/journal.pone.0119627. ISSN 1932-6203. PMC 4368666. PMID 25794146.
- Nanglu, Karma; Cole, Selina R.; Wright, David F.; Souto, Camilla (2023). "Worms and gills, plates and spines: the evolutionary origins and incredible disparity of deuterostomes revealed by fossils, genes, and development". Biological Reviews. 98: 316–351. doi:10.1111/brv.12908.
- Rahman, Imran A.; Zamora, Samuel (July 2024). "Origin and early evolution of echinoderms". Annual Review of Earth and Planetary Sciences. 52: 295–320. doi:10.1146/annurev-earth-031621-113343. hdl:10141/623070.
- Smith, Andrew B. (1984). "Classification of the Echinodermata" (PDF). Palaeontology. 27 (3): 431–459.
- Telford, M. J.; Lowe, C. J.; Cameron, C. B.; Ortega-Martinez, O.; Aronowicz, J.; Oliveri, P.; Copley, R. R. (2014). "Phylogenomic analysis of echinoderm class relationships supports Asterozoa". Proceedings of the Royal Society B: Biological Sciences. 281 (1786) 20140479. doi:10.1098/rspb.2014.0479. PMC 4046411. PMID 24850925.
- Ubaghs, Georges (1967). "General Characters of Echinodermata". In Moore, Raymond C. (ed.). Treatise on Invertebrate Paleontology, Part S: Echinodermata 1. Vol. 1. University of Kansas Press. pp. S3–S60.
