= Dapingian =

First age of the Middle Ordovician epoch

- 471.3 ± 1.4 – 469.4 ± 0.9 Ma
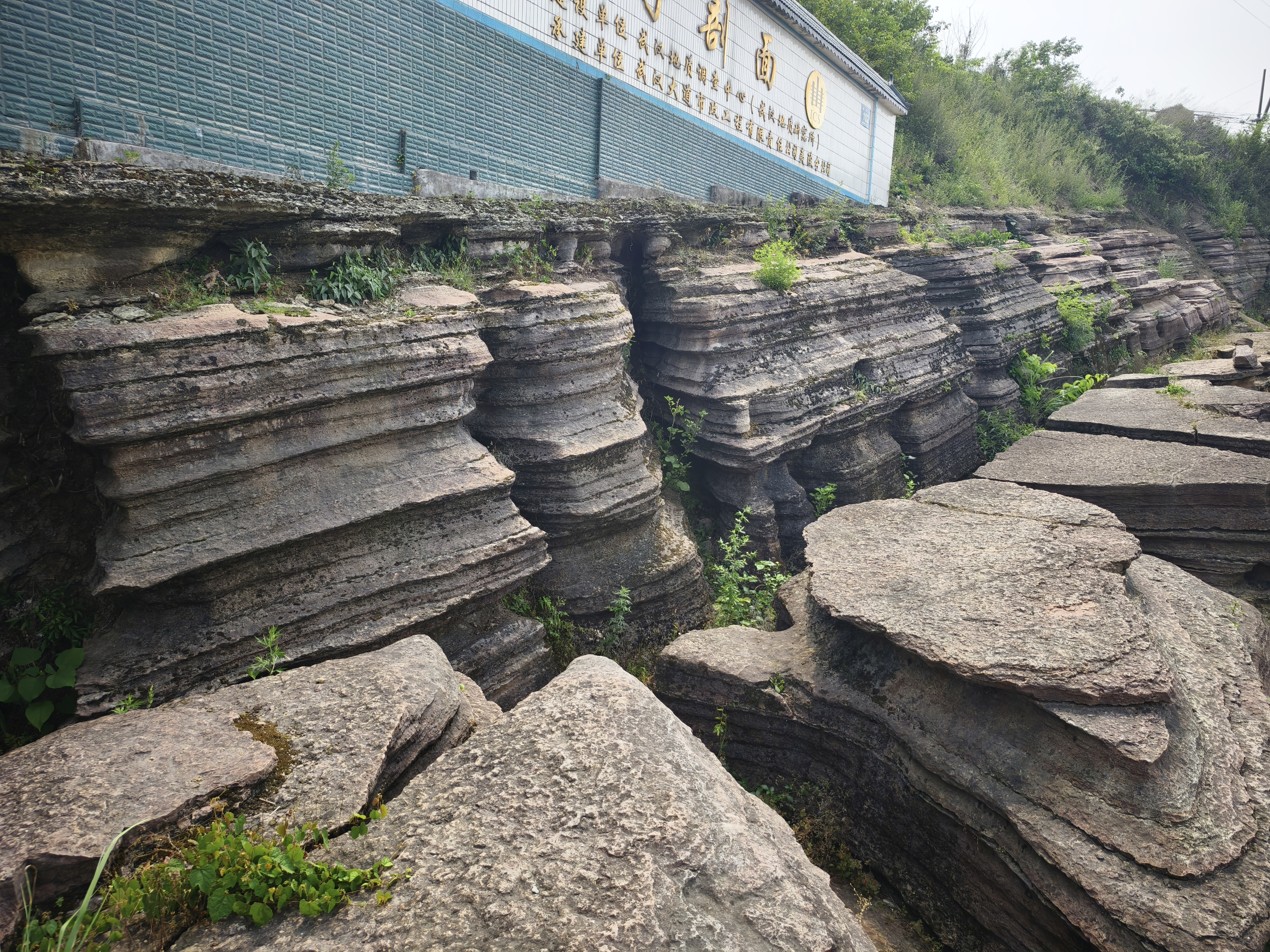
- Dawan Formation, about 4 meter above the GSSP for the Dapingian stage and Middle Ordovician series, in Huanghuachang, Hubei, China

Chronology
← / First land plant spores; ← / Ordovician meteor event
Subdivision of the Ordovician according to the ICS, as of 2024. Vertical axis scale: Millions of years ago

Etymology
- Name formality: Formal

Usage information
- Celestial body: Earth
- Regional usage: Global (ICS)
- Time scale(s) used: ICS Time Scale

Definition
- Chronological unit: Age
- Stratigraphic unit: Stage
- Time span formality: Formal
- Lower boundary definition: FAD of the Conodont Baltoniodus triangularis
- Lower boundary GSSP: Huanghuachang section, Huanghuachang, Yichang, China; 30.8605°N 110.3740°E
- Lower GSSP ratified: 2007
- Upper boundary definition: FAD of the Graptolite Undulograptus austrodentatus
- Upper boundary GSSP: Huangnitang Section, Huangnitang Village, Changshan, Zhejiang, China; 28.8539°N 118.4897°E
- Upper GSSP ratified: 1997

The Dapingian is the third stage of the Ordovician system and the first stage of the Middle Ordovician series. It is preceded by the Floian and succeeded by the Darriwilian. The base of the Dapingian (and the top of the Floian) is defined as the first appearance of the conodont species Baltoniodus triangularis which happened about 471.3 million years ago. The Dapingian lasted for about 1.9 million years until about 469.4 million years ago.

== History ==
The Ordovician was divided into three series and six global stages in 1995. Although at the time of 2005 GSSPs for the overlying Darriwilian and underlying "second stage" had already been ratified, definition of a GSSP for the first stage of the Middle Ordovician Series caused difficulties due to the deficiencies of the selected biohorizon and section. The Dapingian was the last Ordovician stage to be ratified, and was initially referred to as an informal and unnamed "third stage" corresponding to the early part of the Middle Ordovician. This third stage was meant to represent the appearance of several major index fossils. The conodont Baltoniodus triangularis, a species found in Baltica and China, defined the base of the regional Baltoscandian Volkhov stage. Another conodont, Tripodus laevis, defined the base of the Whiterockian stage in western North America. T. laevis was also roughly correlated with the appearance of the graptolite Isograptus v. lunatus.

The Whiterock Narrows section in the Ninemile Formation of Nevada was the initial suggestion for the GSSP of the third stage, but a 2001 review of the site revealed that its local conodont fauna was misaligned with wider graptolite zonation. In its place, two formal GSSP candidates were proposed. The Niquivil section of Argentina used another widespread species, Protoprioniodus (Cooperignathus) aranda, as a proxy for B. triangularis, T. laevis, and graptolites, which were absent from the section. The Huanghuachang section of China hosted a more diverse fauna of index fossils, including Baltoniodus triangularis and biostratigraphically useful graptolites and chitinozoans. The Huanghuachang section was approved as the GSSP for the third stage in 2006, and was ratified by the ICS in 2007.

=== Naming ===
The Dapingian is named after Daping, a village that lies near the Dapingian GSSP at Huanghuachang. The Chenjiahe section, an outcrop with similar rocks, can be found 5 km to the north of the Huanghuachang section. The name of the Dapingian stage was introduced in June 2007 and approved alongside the stage's ratification, beating out earlier suggestions such as "Volkhovian" and "Huanghuachangian".

== Global Boundary Stratotype Section and Point ==
Map of China showing the GSSP location.

The Global Boundary Stratotype Section and Point (GSSP) of the Dapingian is the Huanghuachang section (30.8605°N 110.3740°E), in Huanghuachang, Yichang, China. It is an outcrop of the Dawan Formation. The lower boundary is defined as the first appearance of the conodont species Baltoniodus triangularis in the type section. Radiometric dating has constrained the Floian-Dapingian boundary at 471.3 million years ago. The exact boundary lies 10.57 m above the base of Dawan Formation.

== Regional stages ==
The Dapingian overlaps with the upper part of the Arenig, a geologic stage used in England. It is also equivalent to the lower part of the North American Whiterockian stage, most of the Baltic/Russian Volkhov stage, and the Castlemainian and Yapeenian stages which have been used in Australia. In Baltoscandia, especially in the East Baltic, the global stage boundary corresponds to the bases of the Megistaspis polyphemus Trilobite Zone and probably Isograptus victoriae victoriae Graptolite Zone.

== Ocean and climate ==
At the beginning of the Dapingian, there was a drop in sea level of 70–80 m, which is reflected in the rocks as a well-developed hardground surface in Baltoscandia. Changes in sea level during Dapingian age appear to be associated with short pulses of cooling, which have become a harbinger of much colder climate in the next Darriwilian age. At the end of the Dapingian, continental ice was growing with small changes in volume caused by changes in the Earth's orbit.

== Major events ==
The Great Ordovician Biodiversification Event (GOBE) lasted in the Dapingian. Fan et al. (2020) define GOBE as a 20 Myr interval that began in the Tremadocian and ended in the late Dapingian, although other researchers have suggested different temporal limits.

The extensive transgression associated with rapid tectonic subsidence, occurred at the end of the Dapingian in the Southern Urals.

The Komstad Regressive Event roughly corresponds to the Dapingian.

== Paleontology ==
Funeralaspis, the oldest named odontopleurine trilobite, was discovered in the Dapingian of the Antelope Valley Formation in Inyo County, California.

Since the Dapingian, there has been a connection between the Afro-European part of Gondwana and Baltica, which is confirmed by the discovery of fossils of cornutan stylophorans Phyllocystis in these regions. Planopora, the oldest сystoporate bryozoan to form erect, bifoliate colonies, is known from the Dapingian of the Baltic paleobasin, Leningrad Oblast, Russia.
