= Tremadocian =

Lowest stage of Ordovician

- 486.85 ± 1.5 – 477.1 ± 1.2 Ma

Chronology
← / First land plant spores; ← / Ordovician meteor event
Subdivision of the Ordovician according to the ICS, as of 2024. Vertical axis scale: Millions of years ago

Etymology
- Name formality: Formal

Usage information
- Celestial body: Earth
- Regional usage: Global (ICS)
- Time scale(s) used: ICS Time Scale

Definition
- Chronological unit: Age
- Stratigraphic unit: Stage
- Time span formality: Formal
- Lower boundary definition: FAD of the Conodont Iapetognathus fluctivagus.
- Lower boundary GSSP: Greenpoint section, Green Point, Newfoundland, Canada; 49.6829°N 57.9653°W
- Lower GSSP ratified: 2000
- Upper boundary definition: FAD of the Graptolite Tetragraptus approximatus
- Upper boundary GSSP: Diabasbrottet quarry, Västergötland, Sweden; 58.3589°N 12.5024°E
- Upper GSSP ratified: 2002

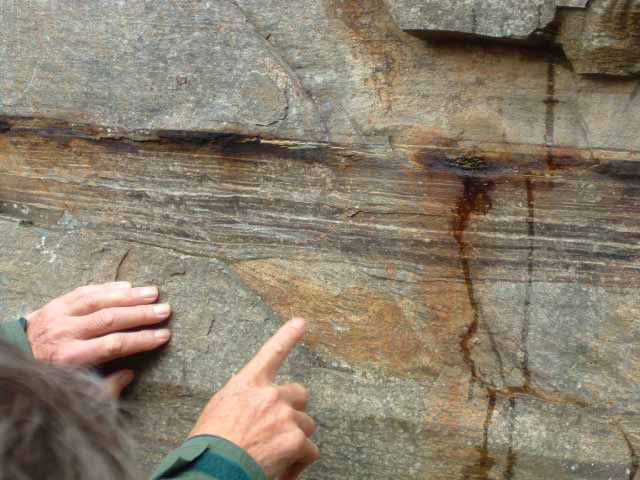
Rock from the Skiddaw Group, of Ordovician (Tremadocian) age, at Scawgill Bridge quarry in Cumbria, England, UK

The Tremadocian is the lowest stage of Ordovician. Together with the later Floian Stage it forms the Lower Ordovician Epoch. The Tremadocian lasted from 486.85 to 477.1 million years ago. The base of the Tremadocian is defined as the first appearance of the conodont species Iapetognathus fluctivagus at the Global Boundary Stratotype Section and Point (GSSP) section on Newfoundland.

== Naming ==
The Tremadocian is named after the village Tremadog (formerly Tremadoc) in Wales. The name was proposed by Adam Sedgwick in 1846 (as "Tremadoc group").

== GSSP ==
The GSSP for the beginning of the Tremadocian is the Green Point section (49.6829°N 57.9653°W) in Gros Morne National Park, in western Newfoundland. It is defined as the first appearance of the conodont species Iapetognathus fluctivagus. This horizon can be found 101.8 m above the Greenpoint section datum within bed number 23. The boundary lies within the Broom Point Member, of the Green Point Formation which is part of the Cow Head Group. The first planktonic graptolites appear 4.8 m above the first appearance of Iapetognathus fluctivagus at Greenpoint section.

The Tremadocian ends with the beginning of the Floian which is defined as the first appearance of Tetragraptus approximatus at the GSSP in Diabasbrottet quarry, Västergötland, Sweden.

In 2015, the Lawson Cove section in Millard County, Utah, was proposed as an Auxiliary boundary Stratotype Section and Point (ASSP) for the Tremadocian stage and Ordovician system. In addition to the first appearance datum of I. fluctivagus, fossils of olenid trilobite Jujuyaspis and planktonic graptolite Anisograptus matanensis are present in a nearby section. In 2017, the Xiaoyangqiao section near the Dayangcha Village, North China, was proposed as the second ASSP for the base of Tremadocian/Lower Ordovician. The first planktonic graptolites can be found right below the Cordylodus lindstromi Conodont Zone in this section. Both ASSPs were approved through supermajority vote by the Subcommission on Ordovician Stratigraphy in 2016 and 2019, respectively. However, in 2021, the International Union of Geological Sciences (IUGS) proposed to deny the use of specific points and replace them by Standard Auxiliary Boundary Stratotypes (SABS) for more "flexible" correlations with GSSPs.

== Regional stages ==
In North America the first stage of the Ordovician is the Gasconadian Stage. In the Baltic region, the stages corresponding to Tremadocian are the Pakerort stage (lower) and the Varangu stage (upper).

== Major events ==
The Cambrian-Tremadocian boundary is marked by the Cambrian-Ordovician extinction event. Overall the amount of biodiversity of the Cambrian was maintained. At the beginning of the Tremadocian, about 485.4 million years ago, biodiversity, which had been at a low level, began its long increase phase, known as the Great Ordovician Biodiversification Event.

At the Furongian‒Tremadocian boundary, a mantle plume event occurred on the territory of the northwestern Gondwana, which is now the Iberian Peninsula. Ollo de Sapo magmatic event continued in this region further into Ordovician.

Several global events are observed in sediments of the Tremadocian age: the Acerocare Regressive Event, Black Mountain Transgressive Event (both in the Early Tremadocian), Peltocare Regressive Event, Kelly Creek Regressive Event, and Ceratopyge Regressive Event (the last two in the Late Tremadocian). Lithological features of the Black Mountain event are observed in Australia and Gorny Altai, Russia. The Ceratopyge Regressive Event records in Baltica at the end of the Apatokephalus serratus zone. Above the disappearance of Ceratopyge fauna, sediments are presented in a more depleted form due to the decreased sea level in the Late Tremadocian.

The middle of the Tremadocian witnessed an extinction event known as the Mid-Tremadocian Extinction Event or the Base Stairsian Mass Extinction Event, which is particularly known to have affected Baltican conodonts. This extinction event may have been caused by anoxia.

== Tremadocian life ==
Planktonic graptolites, an important index fossil, appear during the Tremadocian. Tremadocian cephalopods were not very different from their Cambrian predecessors. Specimens of Ellesmeroceras and possibly Bassleroceras, found in Santa Rosita Formation, northwestern Argentina, show that cephalopods first migrated to the waters off western Gondwana already in the early Tremadocian. In the middle Tremadocian, cephalopods became more diverse and occupied new ecological niches. During Tremadocian there was an exchange of fauna between Avalonia and Gondwana across the Rheic Ocean, as evidenced by the findings of morphologically similar trilobites of the genus Platypeltoides in Belgium, Wales (both were parts of Avalonia) and Morocco (Gondwana).

== Ocean and climate ==
The Early Ordovician in general was a time of transgression. The climate was slowly cooling throughout the Ordovician.
