= Floian =

Second and last age of the Early Ordovician epoch

- 477.1 ± 1.2 – 471.3 ± 1.4 Ma

Chronology
← / First land plant spores; ← / Ordovician meteor event
Subdivision of the Ordovician according to the ICS, as of 2024. Vertical axis scale: Millions of years ago

Etymology
- Name formality: Formal

Usage information
- Celestial body: Earth
- Regional usage: Global (ICS)
- Time scale(s) used: ICS Time Scale

Definition
- Chronological unit: Age
- Stratigraphic unit: Stage
- Time span formality: Formal
- Lower boundary definition: FAD of the Graptolite Tetragraptus approximatus
- Lower boundary GSSP: Diabasbrottet quarry, Västergötland, Sweden; 58.3589°N 12.5024°E
- Lower GSSP ratified: 2002
- Upper boundary definition: FAD of the Conodont Baltoniodus triangularis
- Upper boundary GSSP: Huanghuachang section, Huanghuachang, Yichang, China; 30.8605°N 110.3740°E
- Upper GSSP ratified: 2007

The Floian is the second stage of the Ordovician Period. It succeeds the Tremadocian with which it forms the Lower Ordovician series. It precedes the Dapingian Stage of the Middle Ordovician. The Floian extended from 477.1 to 471.3 million years ago. The lower boundary is defined as the first appearance of the graptolite species Paratetragraptus approximatus.

== History and naming ==
The base of this stage was ratified by the International Commission on Stratigraphy (ICS) in 2002. The Floian Stage is named after Flo, a village in Västergötland, southern Sweden. The name "Floan" was proposed in 2004, but the ICS adapted Floian as the official name of the stage.

== GSSP ==
The GSSP of the Floian is the lower Tøyen Shale in Diabasbrottet Quarry (58.3589°N 12.5024°E) which is an outcrop of a shale-dominated stratigraphic succession. The lower boundary of the Floian is defined as the first appearance of Tetragraptus approximatus which is about 2.1 above the Cambrian strata. Radiometric dating has set the Tremadocian-Floian boundary at 477.1 million years ago.

The upper boundary which is also the base of the Dapingian stage is defined as the first appearance of the conodont species Baltoniodus triangularis at the GSSP in the Huanghuachang Section, Hubei Province, China.

== Regional stages ==
Partial analogues of Floian stage in Baltoscandia are Hunneberg stage (lower) and Billingen stage (upper). On the Siberian Platform, Ugorian stage corresponds to Floian.

== Major events ==
The global Billingen Transgressive Event occurred in the Early Floian age. Black graptolitic argillites of Gorny Altai as well as conglomerates and gritstones of Salair, Russia, possibly correlates with this event.

== Paleontology ==
Discovered in the Floian strata of Newfoundland, coral-like fossils of Reptamsassia divergens and Reptamsassia minuta are the oldest example of symbiotic intergrowth of modular species. This allows to judge the level of development of reef ecosystems of the Early Ordovician.

Conodonts Serratognathus, Prioniodus and Oepikodus were distributed in Kazakhstan, Korea, China, Indochina and Australasia during the Floian age. Two species of Paroistodus are known from the Floian deposits of Baltoscandia and South China.

Several thousand chemically isolated graptolite specimens including genera Baltograptus and Pseudophyllograptus were collected from the upper Floian sediments of Skattungbyn, Dalarna, central Sweden. Presented mostly by juveniles and isolated siculae, these graptolites inhabited primarily in shallow water environment.

Trilobites of the genera Tsaidamaspis, Zhiyia and Liexiaspis were found in the Floian part of the Duoquanshan Formation, northwest China.

Falloaster anquiroisitus, an asterozoan of problematic classification, is known from the Floian Garden City Formation of Idaho, US
