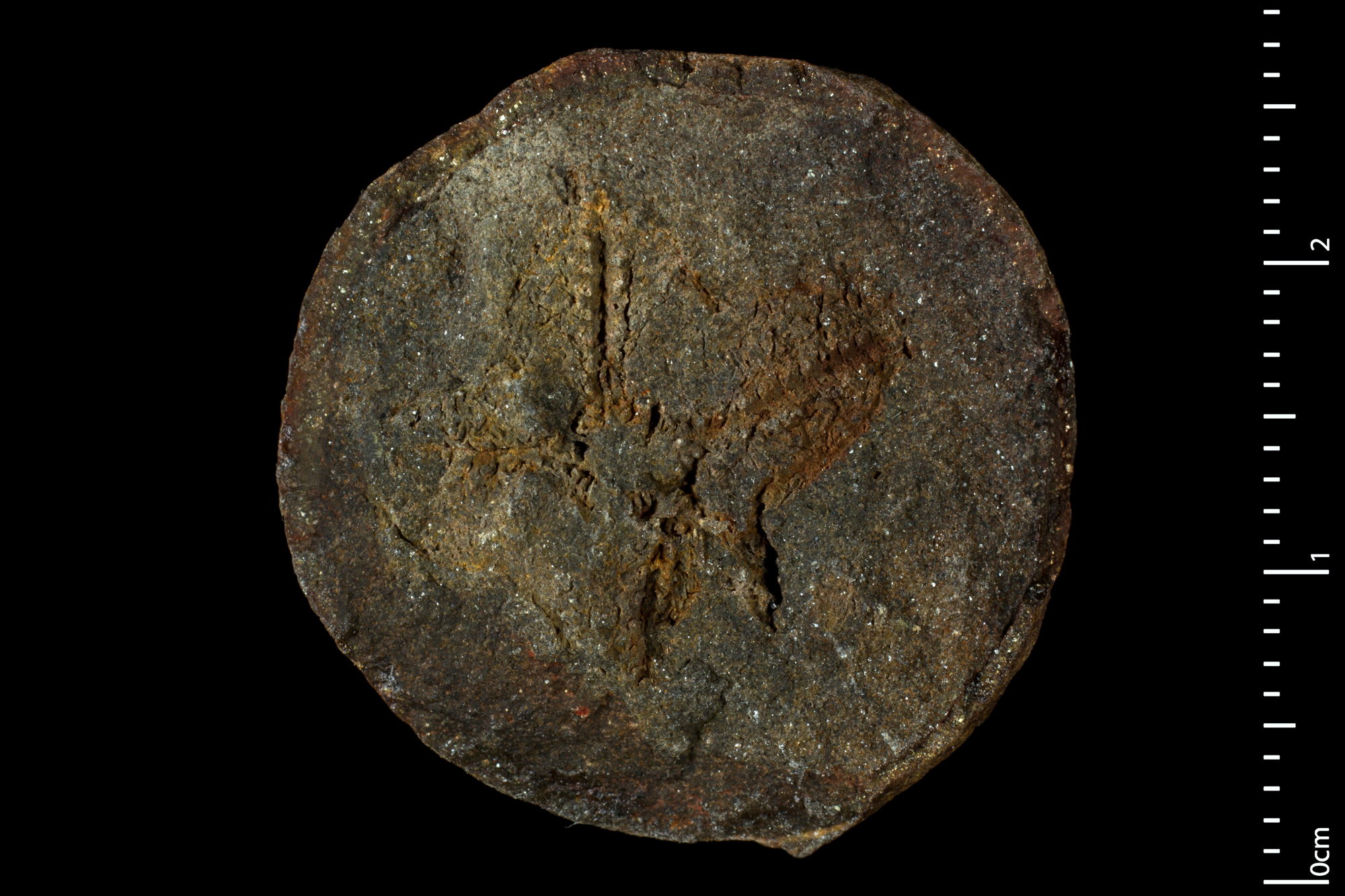
- Villebrunaster thorali, a basal member of the Somasteroidea

Scientific classification
- Kingdom: Animalia
- Phylum: Echinodermata
- Subphylum: Asterozoa
- Order: †Somasteroidea; Spencer, 1951

Families
- †Archegonasteridae Spencer, 1951; †Chinianasteridae Spencer, 1951

= Somasteroidea =

Somasteroidea Temporal range: Ordovician

Extinct order of asterozoan echinoderms

Somasteroidea is an extinct order of asterozoan echinoderms first defined in 1951 by W. K. Spencer. The order is restricted to the Ordovician with their first appearance in the fossil record being in the Early Ordovician (Tremadocian - Floian).

== Characteristics ==
They are similar to the asteroids in that their bodies are flattened dorsoventrally and they have five petaloid arms with broad bases. The ambulacral plates in somasteroids are simple and unspecialized, and the arms are thought to be not flexible and were unable to assist in feeding, but the oral mouth parts were more complex.

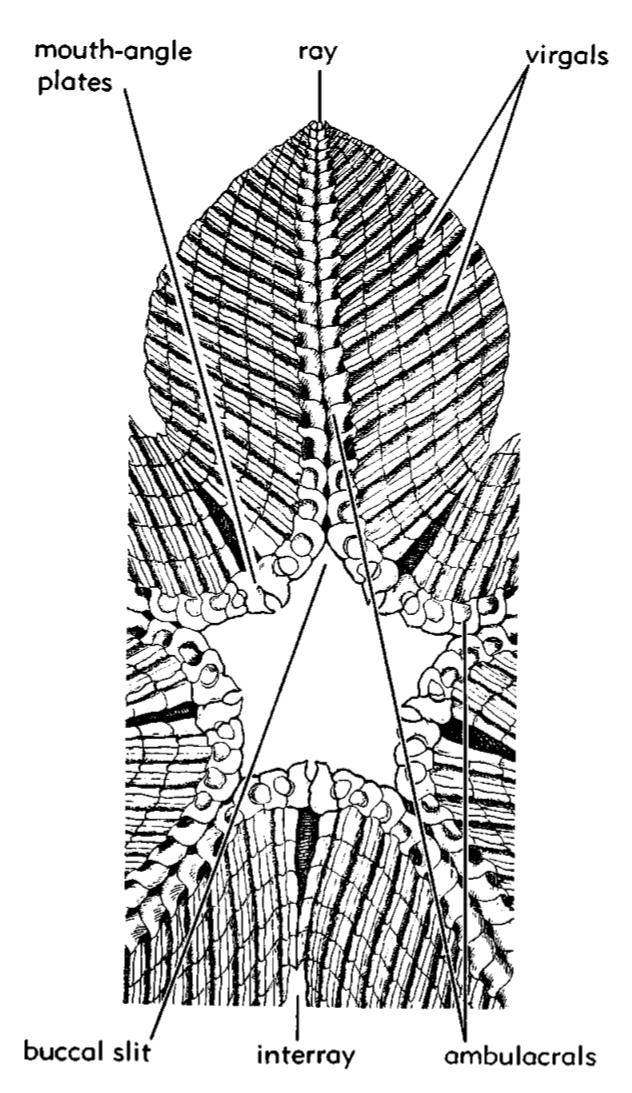
Villebrunaster thorali (Somasteroidea)

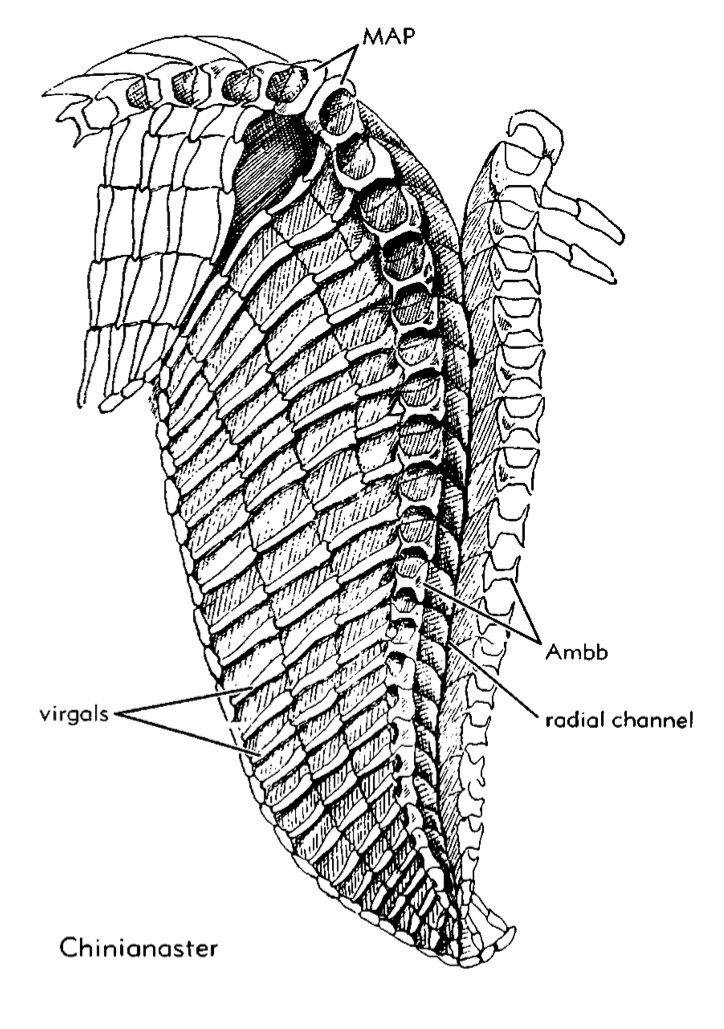
Chiniaster (Somasteroidea)

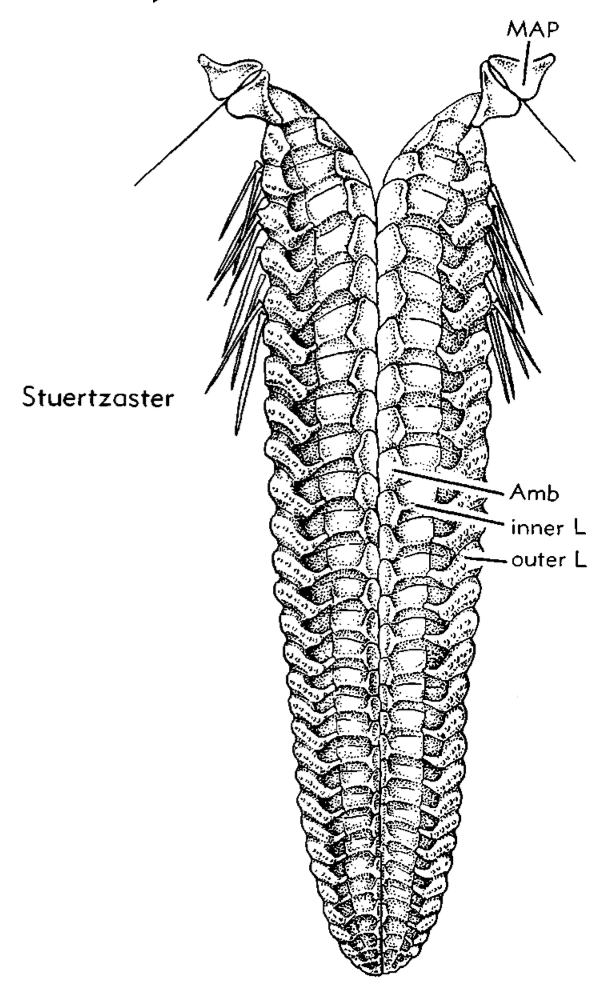
Stuertzaster (Stenuroidea)

Differences in virgals between somasteroids and stenuroids; note that in somasteroids the number of virgals per ambulacral varies based on the width of the arm, while the number of virgals (labeled as inner and outer laterals) in stenuroids is the same along the entire length of the arm.

Most authors consider Somasteroidea to be the basal stock from which the other three classes evolved, but an argument in favor of monophyly and a position closer to stenuroids and ophiuroids than to asteroids has also been made.

Somasteroids are treated as stemward among asterozoans and are most clearly delineated by presence the of series of rod-like "virgal ossicles" that extend laterally from each ambulacral ossicle. In the derived Asteroidea and Ophiuroidea, the virgal series is reduced to a single ossicle, the so-called "adambulacral" of asteroids and the "lateral" of ophiuroids, and in stenuroids, the series is reduced to two to four ossicles.

Somasteroids are "more or less petaloid," with arm shape reflecting virgal series lengths. Somasteroids have been described as being more rigid in shape than derived asterozoans, although this apparent structure could be exaggerated by tissue changes at the time of death.

== Systematic Paleontology ==
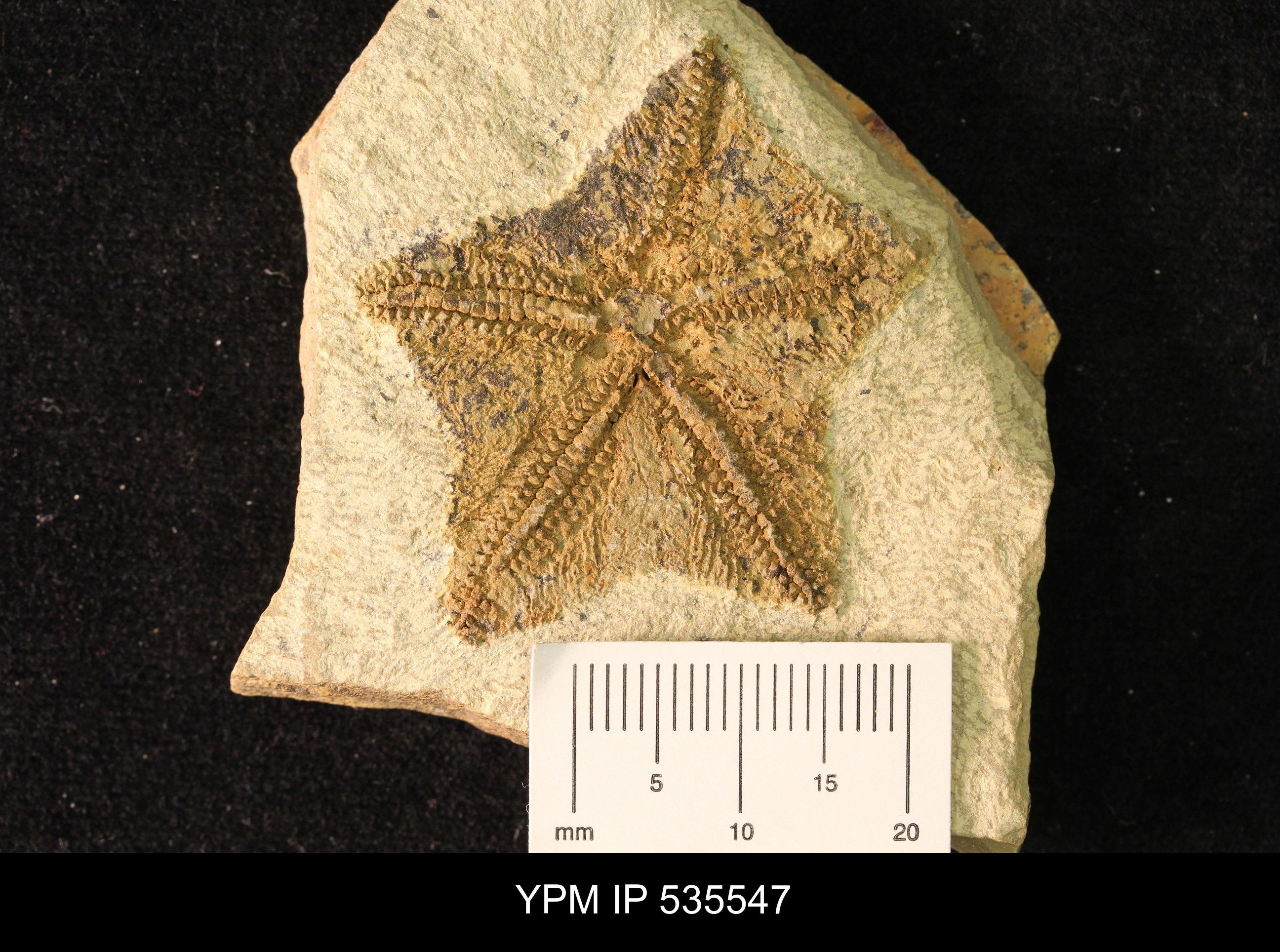
Fossil of Cantabrigiaster fezouataensis

The systematics of Somasteroidea is as follows.

- † Family Chinianasteridae Spencer, 1951
  - † Subfamily Chinianasterinae Spencer, 1951
    - † Genus Chinianaster Thoral, 1935
      - † Chinianaster levyi Thoral, 1935
    - † Genus Cantabrigiaster Hunter & Ortega-Hernández, 2021
      - † Cantabrigiaster fezouataensis Hunter & Ortega-Hernández, 2021
    - † Genus Thoralaster Dean Shackleton, 2005
      - † Thoralaster spiculiformis Dean Shackleton, 2005
  - † Subfamily Villebrunasterinae Fell, 1963b
    - † Genus Villebrunaster Spencer, 1951
      - † Villebrunaster thorali Spencer, 1951
    - † Genus Ampullaster Fell, 1963b
      - † Ampullaster ubaghsi Fell, 1963b
  - † Subfamily Ophioxenikosinae Blake & Lefebvre 2025
    - † Genus Ophioxenikos Blake & Guensburg, 1993
      - † Ophioxenikos langenheimi Blake & Guensburg, 1993
- † Family Archegonasteridae Spencer, 1951
  - † Genus Archegonaster Jaekel, 1923
    - † Archegonaster pentagonus Spencer, 1951
