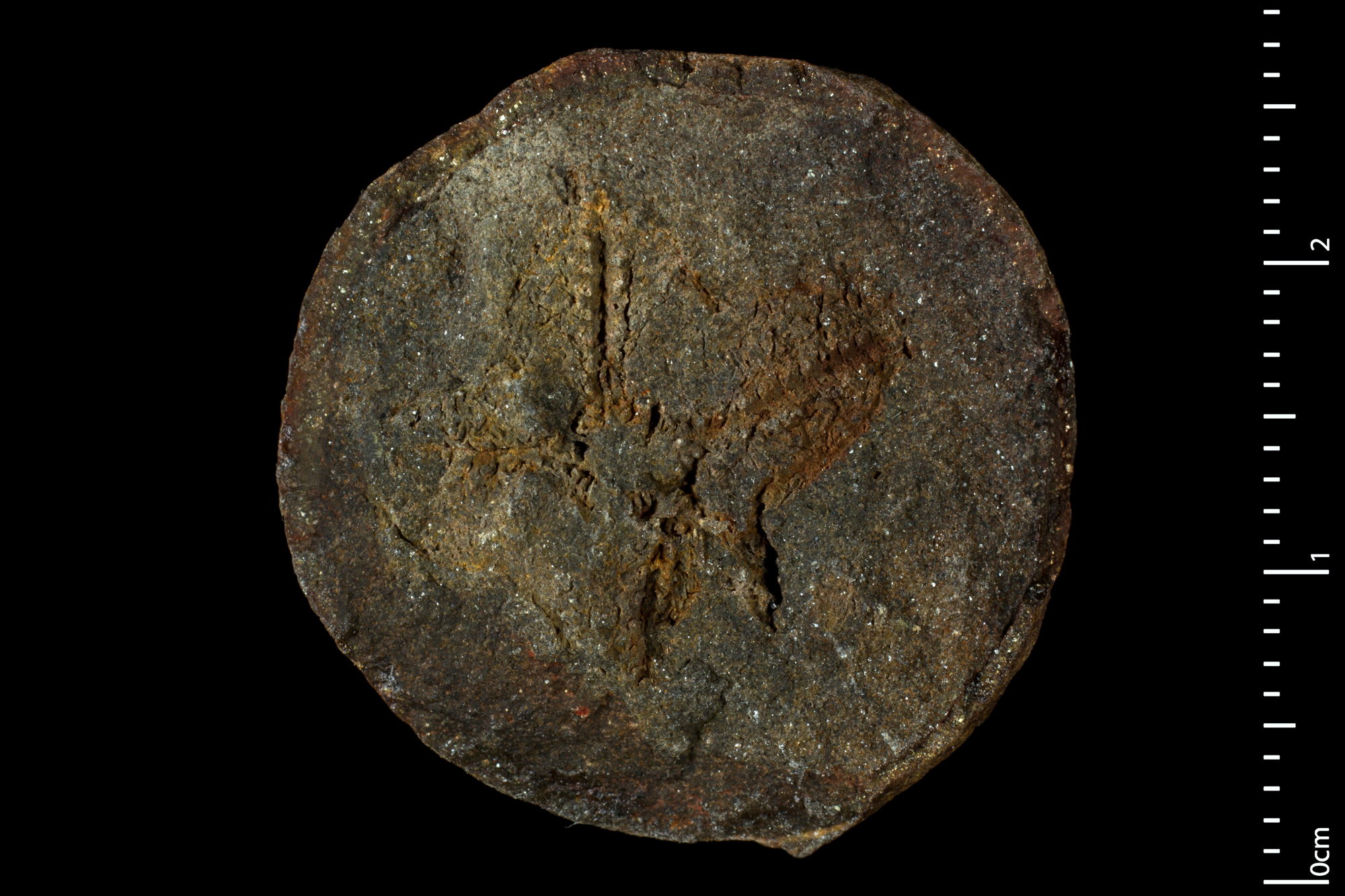
- Fossil of V. thorali
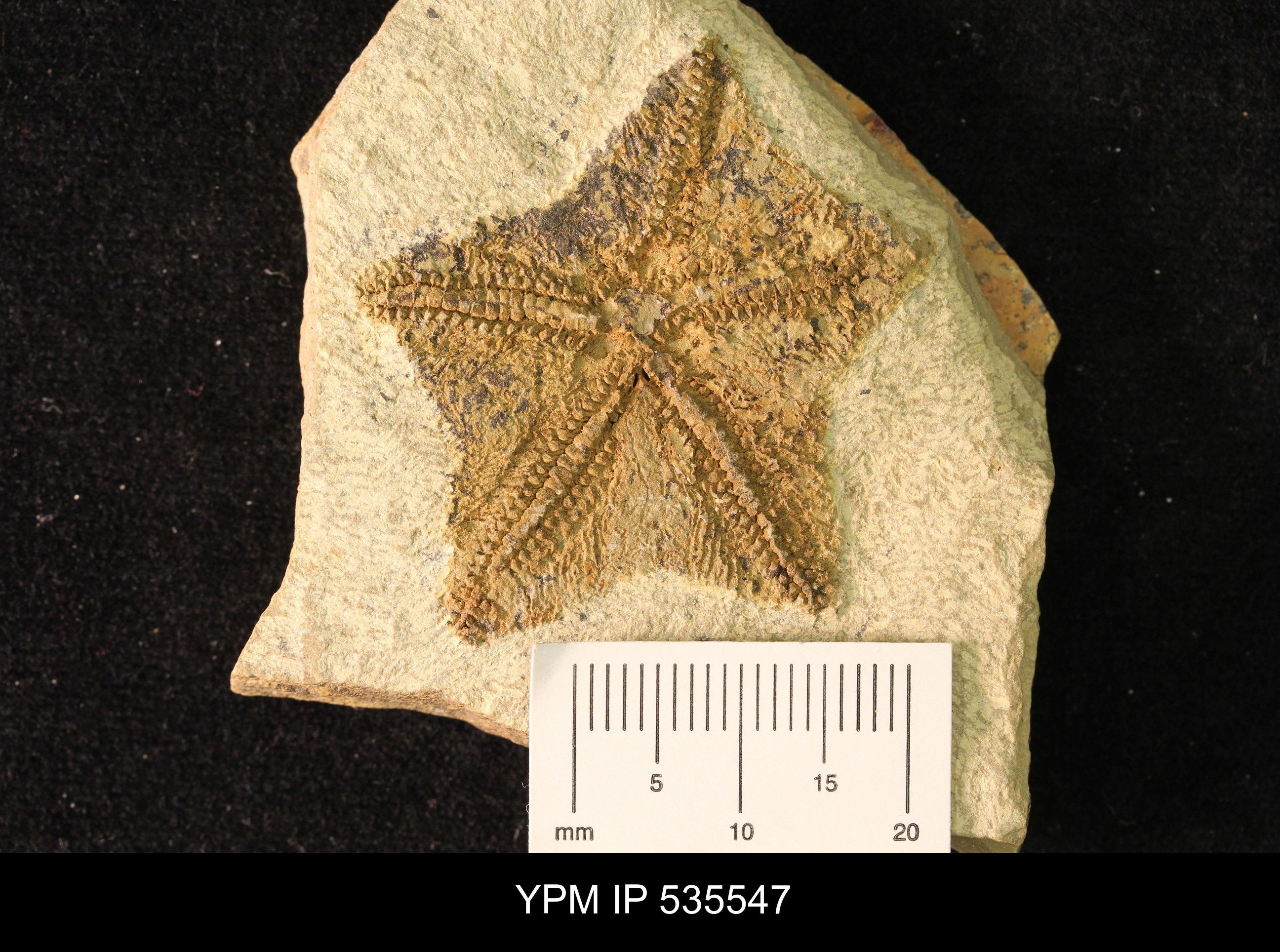
- Fossil of V. fezouataensis

Scientific classification
- Kingdom: Animalia
- Phylum: Echinodermata
- Order: †Somasteroidea
- Family: †Chinianasteridae
- Genus: †Villebrunaster; Spencer, 1951

Type species
- †Villebrunaster thorali Spencer, 1951

Other species
- †V. fezouataensis (Hunter & Ortega-Hernández, 2021)

Synonyms
- Ampullaster Fell, 1963; Cantabrigiaster Hunter & Ortega-Hernández, 2021

= Villebrunaster =

Villebrunaster Temporal range: Early Ordovician, ~480 Ma

Extinct genus of echinoderms

Villebrunaster is an extinct genus of starfish-like animal belonging to Asterozoa that lived around 480 million years ago during Early Ordovician Period in modern-day southern France and Morocco. As of 2022, it contains two species, namely V. thorali and V. fezouataensis. V. thorali was described in 1951 and V. fezouataensis was described in 2021. Villebrunaster represents one of the oldest members of asterozoans, and perhaps, according to a description in 2021, the earliest divergent stem-group (ancestral members) of Asterozoa.

== Discovery and species ==
The first species was discovered and described by British palaeontologist William Kingdon Spencer in 1951. The fragmentary specimens were collected from Saint-Chinian Formation in southern France. Spencer recognised it as among "the earliest starfish known." Another British palaeontologist, Juliette Dean Shackleton, identified new specimens as Ampullaster ubaghsi in 2005, which were later reclassified as V. thorali.

The second species, V. fezouataensis, was described by Aaron W. Hunter and Javier Ortega-Hernández at the University of Cambridge as Cantabrigiaster fezouataensis in 2021. The specimens, originally collected from Fezouata Shale Formation in Morocco, were reanalysed by American palaeontologists Daniel B. Blake and Frederick H.C.Hotchkiss who moved to taxonomic position the genus Villebrunaster in 2022.

== Description ==
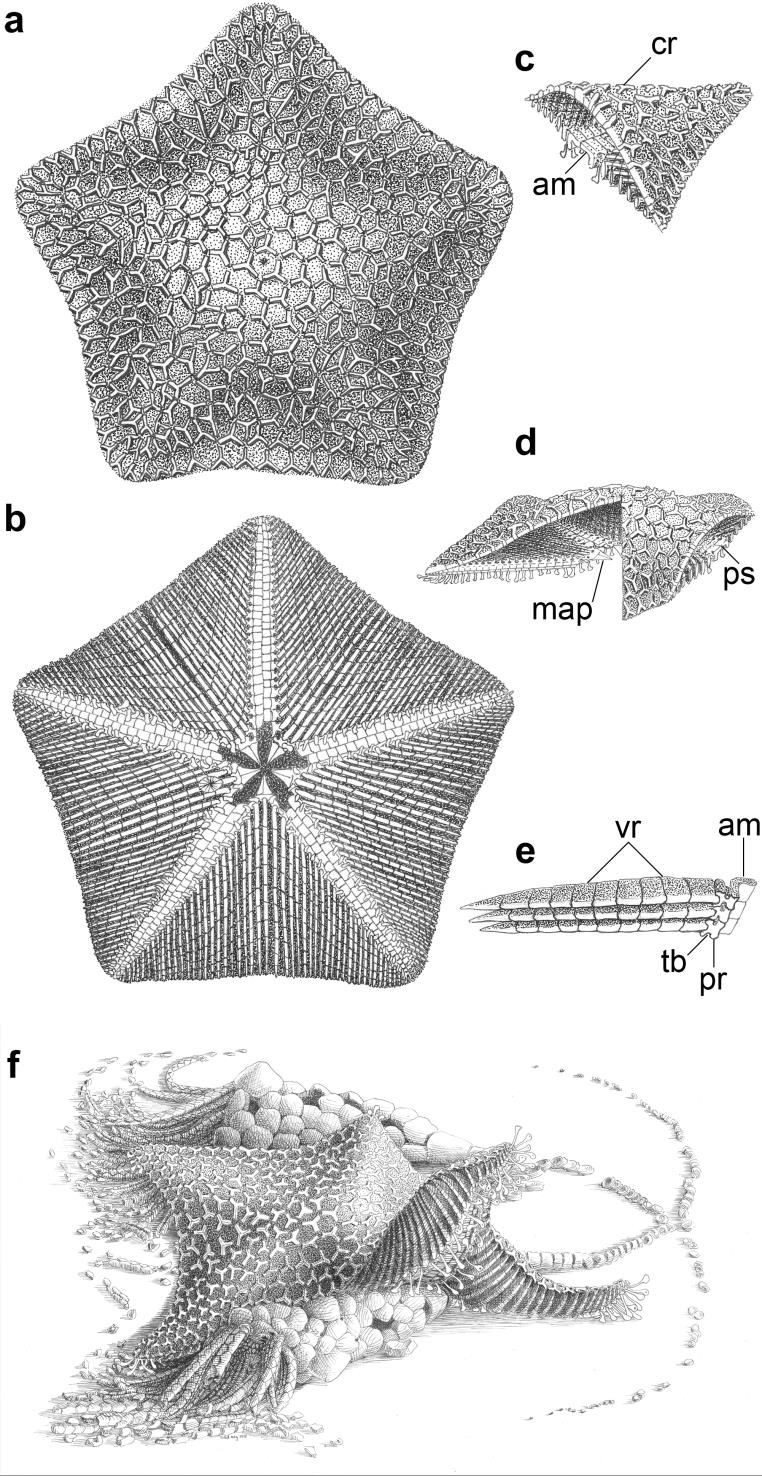
Reconstruction of V. fezouataensis

The body of Villebrunaster is that of a typical starfish having five radiating arms with the mouth at the centre of the body, facing the substrate. The mouth region is composed of three types of endoskeletons called ossicles, such as the half-cylinders or ambulacrals, the virgals that form skeleton between the ambulacrals, and a pair of mouth plates that radiate into the mouth opening. The arms are broad and evenly arranged to form pentagonal structure.

The presence of multiple virgal ossicles in each series running perpendicular to the ambulacra is a feature of the Somasteroidea. However, Villebrunaster lacks axially oriented ossicles along the lateral margins of the arms, which are found in other somasteroids. This suggests that it is a primitive member of the group. The radial water channels are large and run close to the ventral side of the body, while the transverse water channels are small and difficult to recognize. The ossicle series are larger in V. fezouataensis than in V. thorali.

== Evolutionary importance ==
Phylogenetic analysis indicate that Villebrunaster is oldest known and the earliest diverging group among Asterozoa, a group that includes starfish, brittle stars and basket stars. The absence of some ambulacral ossicles but presence of virgal ossicles show that the development and variation of ossicles are the important features in the evolution of later asterozoans. However, the genus does not necessarily represent the common ancestor of Asterozoa.
