= Diabasbrottet Quarry =

Geologic formation in Sweden

The Diabasbrottet Quarry (58°21′32.2″N 12°30′08.6″E), located on Mt. Hunneberg, Västergötland, Sweden, is the location of the Global Boundary Stratotype Section and Point (GSSP) which marks the lower boundary of the Floian stage of the Lower Ordovician.

The lower boundary of the Floian is defined as the first appearance of Tetragraptus approximatus, a graptolite species. The rock section belongs to the Tøyen Formation and is dominated by shale. It is unusually fossiliferous, including fossilized remains of graptolites, conodonts, and trilobites. It is highly compressed, and the Ordovician section is only 12 m thick.

The Floian stage is named after Flo Parish, a village 5 km to the southeast of the Diabasbrottet quarry.

It was selected over "The Ledge" in western Newfoundland in 2000 and ratified as the GSSP by the International Union of Geological Sciences in 2002.
