= Huanghuachang =

Village in Hubei, China

Map of China showing the GSSP location.

Huanghuachang (Chinese: 黄花场村; pinyin: Huanghuachang cun) is a village in Huanghua, Yiling, Yichang, Hubei, China.

An outcrop of sedimentary rock from the Ordovician has made Huanghuachang famous in the earth science community. The "Huanghuachang section" (30.8605°N 110.3740°E) is an outcrop of the Dawan Formation in which the official base of the Dapingian stage is defined. (Daping is a settlement near to Huanghuachang).
