= Early Ordovician =

First epoch of the Ordovician period

Early/Lower Ordovician
- 486.85 ± 1.5 – 471.3 ± 1.4 Ma
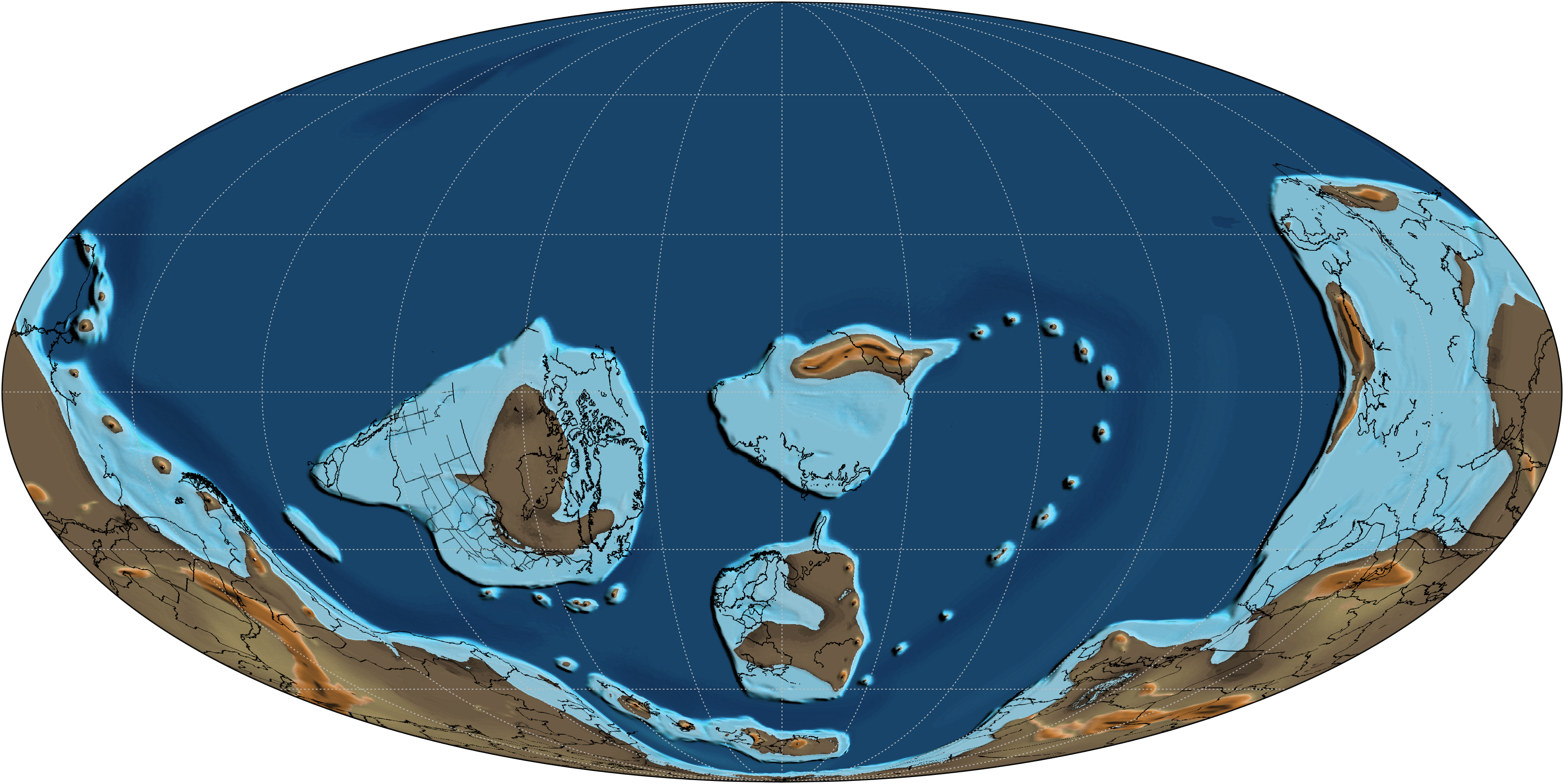
- A map of Earth as it appeared 480 million years ago during the Early Ordovician Epoch, Tremadocian Age

Chronology
← / First land plant spores; ← / Ordovician meteor event
Subdivision of the Ordovician according to the ICS, as of 2024. Vertical axis scale: Millions of years ago

Etymology
- Chronostratigraphic name: Lower Ordovician
- Geochronological name: Early Ordovician
- Name formality: Formal

Usage information
- Celestial body: Earth
- Regional usage: Global (ICS)
- Time scale(s) used: ICS Time Scale

Definition
- Chronological unit: Epoch
- Stratigraphic unit: Series
- Time span formality: Formal
- Lower boundary definition: FAD of the conodont Iapetognathus fluctivagus.
- Lower boundary GSSP: Greenpoint section, Green Point, Newfoundland, Canada; 49.6829°N 57.9653°W
- Lower GSSP ratified: 2000
- Upper boundary definition: FAD of the conodont Baltoniodus triangularis
- Upper boundary GSSP: Huanghuachang section, Huanghuachang, Yichang, China; 30.8605°N 110.3740°E
- Upper GSSP ratified: 2007

Atmospheric and climatic data
- Mean atmospheric O_{2} content: c. 11.5 vol % (55% of modern)

The Early Ordovician is the first epoch of the Ordovician period, corresponding to the Lower Ordovician series of the Ordovician system. It began after the Age 10 of the Furongian epoch of the Cambrian and lasted from 486.85 to 471.3 million years ago, until the Dapingian age of the Middle Ordovician. It includes Tremadocian and Floian ages.

== History ==
International Commission on Stratigraphy (ICS) appointed working groups on the boundaries of the Ordovician subdivisions in 1974. The boundaries were established by the fauna of conodonts and/or graptolites. In 1995, the Subcommission on Ordovician Stratigraphy, with the support of 90% majority of voting members, adopted the division of the Ordovician system into three series: Lower, Middle and Upper. In the same year, it was decided to divide each of the three series into two global stages. Tetragraptus approximatus zone was chosen as the base of the upper stage of the Lower Ordovician by 95% of the votes. Before the adoption of the international standard, the series from the chart of Britain, the type locality of the Ordovician system, were accepted by default as Ordovician subdivisions. In accordance with this scale, the Ordovician was divided into six series, of which the lower one, the Tremadocian, passed into the International Stratigraphic Chart (ISC) as the stage of the same name. The upper Arenig series corresponds to the upper part of the Lower and lower part of the Middle Ordovician global series. On the British chart, the boundaries of Ordovician subdivisions are determined by local stratigraphic and paleontological features that are poorly defined in the rest of the world. As a result, local series and stages, very different from the British standard, were identified on different paleoplates or modern continents. In 2008, the traditional British Ordovician subdivisions were replaced by seven new stages with defined GSSPs. Tremadocian and Floian stages were included in the Lower Ordovician series. In 2011, the Russian regional stratigraphic chart was changed from the British to the international standard division of the Ordovician system.

== Definition ==
The Global Boundary Stratotype Section and Point (GSSP) of the Lower Ordovician, which is also a GSSP of the Tremadocian stage and the whole Ordovician system, is established in the Green Point section in the west of the Newfoundland, Canada (49.6829°N 57.9653°W) and corresponds to the first appearance datum (FAD) of the conodont Iapetognathus fluctivagus at the 101.8 m above the base of the outcrop. Doubts have been expressed about the identification of the index taxon, but it occurs below the Rhabdinopora and related graptolites. The GSSP of the Floian, the second and last stage of the Lower Ordovician, is established in the Diabasbrottet Quarry, Sweden, (58.3589°N 12.5024°E) and defined by FAD of the graptolite Tetragraptus approximatus.

Two Auxiliary boundary Stratotype Sections and Points (ASSPs) were also established for the Lower Ordovician/Tremadocian: the first one in the Lawson Cove section in Millard County, Utah, US, and the second one in the Xiaoyangqiao section, North China. Both ASSPs were approved by the Subcommission on Ordovician Stratigraphy in 2016 and 2019, respectively, but, in 2021, the International Union of Geological Sciences (IUGS) proposed to deny the use of specific points and replace them by Standard Auxiliary Boundary Stratotypes (SABS) for more "flexible" correlations with GSSPs.

== Biostratigraphy ==
The global stages of the Lower Ordovician, as well as of other series, are also subdivided into stage slices (time slices), which are corresponding to the base of conodont or graptolite zones. In addition to the global stages, the Tetragraptus approximatus Zone is also defined in the regional subdivisions of the UK and Australia, and the Didymograptus protobifidus Zone in those of North America, Australia and Baltoscandia.

Conodont (c) and graptolite (g) zones of the Lower Ordovician:
Series	Stage (ICS)	Stage slice
Lower Ordovician	Floian	Didymograptus protobifidus Zone (g)
Lower Ordovician	Floian	Oepikodus evae Zone (c)
Lower Ordovician	Floian	Tetragraptus approximatus Zone (g)
Lower Ordovician	Tremadocian	Paroistodus proteus Zone (c)
Lower Ordovician	Tremadocian	Paltodus deltifer Zone (c)
Lower Ordovician	Tremadocian	Iapetognathus fluctivagus Zone (c)

=== North America ===
The following conodont zones are distinguished in Early Ordovician deposits of Boothia Peninsula, Canada (from upper to lower):

- Oepikodus communis and Reutterodus andinus (Ship Point Formation, Floian);
- Rossodus manitouensis and Acodus deltatus/Oneotodus costatus (upper part of Turner Cliffs Formation, Tremadocian);
- Cordylodus angulatus (lower part of Turner Cliffs, Tremadocian).

=== Asia ===
Graptolite (g) and conodont (c) zonal subdivisions of southern Siberia (from upper to lower):

- Ps. angustifolius elongatus/E. broggeri (g), D. protobifidus (g), Ph. densus (g), upper part of Oepikodus evae (c), plus chitinozoan Conochitina raymondi Zone (Floian);
- Lower part of Ph. densus (g), Ac. balticus (g), lower part of Oepikodus evae (c) (Floian);
- T. approximatus (g), upper part of Paroistodus proteus (c) (Floian);
- Lower part of Paroistodus proteus (c) (Tremadocian);
- K. kiaeri/Ad. tenellus (g), B. ramosus/Tr. osloensis/Al. hyperboreus (g) (Tremadocian);
- Iapetognathus fluctivagus (c) (Tremadocian).

=== Australia ===
On the Australian scale, the global Lower Ordovician roughly corresponds to the Lancefieldian, Bendigonian, Chewtonian and lower Castlemainian stages.

Approximate correlation of graptolite (g) and conodont (c) zones of New South Wales:
Series	Australian stage	Zone
Lower Ordovician	Castlemainian (lower part)	Isograptus victoriae lunatus (g), upper part of Oepikodus evae (c)
Lower Ordovician	Chewtonian	Isograptus primulus (g), Oepikodus evae (c)
Lower Ordovician	Chewtonian	Didymograptus protobifidus (g), Oepikodus evae (c)
Lower Ordovician	Bendigonian	Upper part of Pendeograptus fruticosus (g), lowermost Oepikodus evae (c)
Lower Ordovician	Bendigonian	Lower parts of Pendeograptus fruticosus (g), uppermost Prioniodus elegans (c)
Lower Ordovician	Bendigonian	Pendeograptus fruticosus (g), Prioniodus elegans (c)
Lower Ordovician	Lancefieldian	Uppermost Tetragraptus approximatus (g), lowermost Prioniodus elegans (c)
Lower Ordovician	Lancefieldian	Lower part of Tetragraptus approximatus (g), uppermost Paroistodus proteus (c)
Lower Ordovician	Lancefieldian	Araneograptus murrayi (g), Paroistodus proteus (c)
Lower Ordovician	Lancefieldian	Upper part of Aorograptus victoriae (g), lower part of Paroistodus proteus (c)
Lower Ordovician	Lancefieldian	Lower part of Aorograptus victoriae (g), upper part of Paltodus deltifer (c)
Lower Ordovician	Lancefieldian	Psigraptus jacksoni (g), lower part of Paltodus deltifer (c)
Lower Ordovician	Lancefieldian	Anisograptus (g), upper part of Cordylodus angulatus (c)
Lower Ordovician		Rhabdinopora fl abelliformis parabola (g), Cordylodus angulatus (c)
Lower Ordovician		Lower part of Cordylodus angulatus (c)

== Paleogeography ==
The Iapetus Ocean, located between Gondwana, Laurentia and Baltica, reached over 4000 km in width at the beginning of the Ordovician. In the north, between eastern Laurentia and Siberia, it connected with Panthalassa, which covered about half the planet. Formed in late Cambrian, Rheic Ocean stretched between Gondwana and the microcontinent of Avalonia. Cuyania (northwest of today's Argentina) was located at low latitudes. Gondwana, already a large continent, consisted of today's South America, Africa, the Arabian Peninsula, India, eastern Australia and eastern Antarctica. Laurentia included the territories of Mexico, the US, Canada, Greenland, Scotland and partly Ireland. Laurentia was located in the tropical latitudes of the southern hemisphere; today's central Nevada and western Utah were covered by sea waters at the end of the Early Ordovician.

== Climate ==
In 2007, Bassett et al. analyzed the oxygen isotope values of Early Ordovician strata of the Lange Ranch section in central Texas and concluded that tropical sea temperatures at that time could have reached 37 °C or 42 °C. Similar results were recovered by Trotter et al. in 2008, after oxygen isotope analysis of conodonts from the four paleoplates located in the Early Ordovician at low latitudes. Authors of the 2021 article give values in accordance with the study by Song et al. (2019): from 43.9 °C 485 million years ago to 37.1 °C 470 million years ago. High temperatures that persisted throughout the Early Ordovician affected the biodiversification later, in the Middle Ordovician. CO_{2} level in Early Ordovician atmosphere was high while oxygen levels varied from approximately 10% to 13%.

Studies of oxygen isotopes from apatites (particularly conodont apatites from Nevada and Utah) show that at the end of the Early Ordovician the climate began to change from greenhouse to icehouse. These changes occurred gradually and were accompanied by fluctuations in sea surface temperature with an approximate duration of 10^{4} to 10^{7} years. By the end of the Middle Ordovician, the surface of the low-latitude seas had cooled to temperatures comparable to today's equatorial ones.

== Major events ==
The Great Ordovician Biodiversification Event (GOBE), manifested in an increase in the diversity of marine life, occurred in Early Ordovician. Along with the Cambrian explosion and radiation in the early Mesozoic, it is the most significant biodiversification in the Phanerozoic eon. This event occurred at different intervals depending on the groups of organisms and the geographical region, and, in fact, the GOBE refers to a whole complex of sequential and interconnected processes of evolution and migration of organisms. The first phase, associated with planktonic communities, probably began in the late Cambrian and ended in the late Early Ordovician. The Early Ordovician marks the beginning of the second phase, which affected the inhabitants of benthos. One of the possible signs of the GOBE is the fossil reefs found in the Early Ordovician Dumugol Formation, South Korea. This reefs, built by the microorganisms and sponges of the genus Archaeoscyphia, are different from the Cambrian and early Tremadocian and this discovery confirm that reef communities occupied deeper-sea habitats as early as in the middle Tremadocian. The radiation of marine life during the GOBE in the Early Ordovician was resulted by the transition from sulphidic to oxic conditions in the oceans of that time.

Substantial older ("pre-GOBE") radiations are observed in the Early Ordovician sediments of South China. However, it is questionable, were they global or not.

From the Furongian to the end of the Early Ordovician, 495-470 Ma, the Ollo de Sapo magmatic event occurred on the northwestern territory of Gondwana, which is now the Iberian Peninsula.

== Paleontology ==
In Early Ordovician (Floian) strata of the San Juan Formation, Argentina, the oldest microfossils, known as calcispheres or calcitarchs, are present. Early forms reached 80 to 250 μm in diameter. Some of these organisms are probably algae. Calcitarchs lived in the subtidal zone, from coastal waves to shoals and reefs. Algae of the genus Amsassia appeared. They already lived off the southern coast of Laurentia and Cuyania in the Early Ordovician, and later occupied an even wider range and disappeared only during the Ordovician-Silurian extinction. In Tremadocian, Amsassia inhabited small reefal mounds in shallow sea waters. Discovered in the Floian strata of Newfoundland, coral-like fossils of Reptamsassia divergens and Reptamsassia minuta allows to judge the level of development of reef ecosystems of the Early Ordovician, since they are the oldest example of symbiotic intergrowth of modular species.

Echinoderm diversity increased in the Early Ordovician: new classes appeared, including asteroids, ophiuroids, crinoids and diploporitans. Various Early Ordovician echinoderms are found in the Fillmore Formation in Utah, USA, Fezouata Formation in Anti-Atlas, Morocco, and Saint-Chinian Formation in Montagne Noire, France.

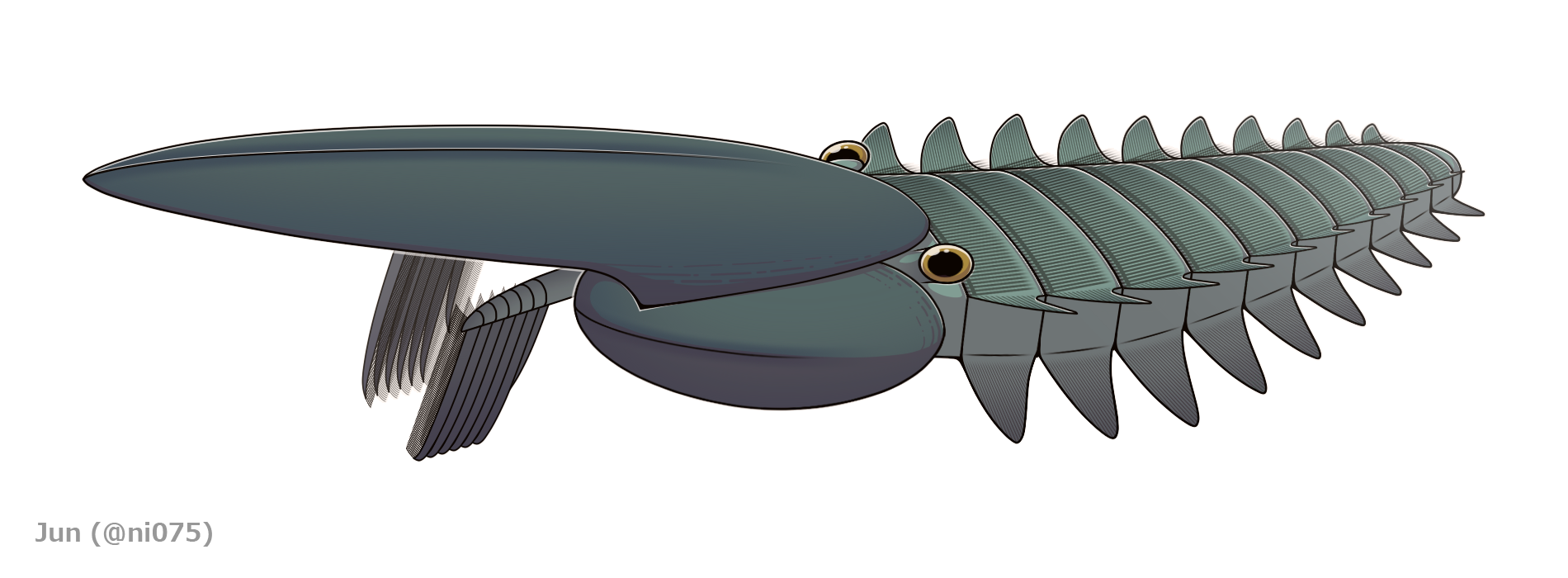
Aegirocassis, a large filter feeder of the Early Ordovician

Nektaspida have become less diverse after Cambrian. They most likely inhabited restricted or colder brackish seas in the Ordovician. Tariccoia tazagurtensis is a member of this arthropod clade from the Lower Ordovician of Morocco. In the same Fezouata Formation, Aegirocassis was discovered. This filter feeder arthropod reached over 2 m in length and was the largest animal of its time. Marrellomorphs, appeared in Cambrian, continued to exist in Early Ordovician.

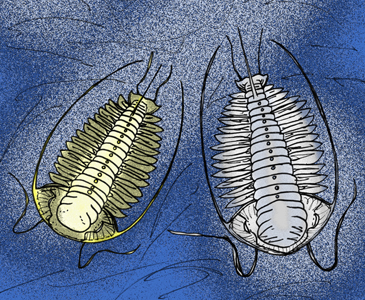
Cloacaspis

Soft-bodied and shelly organisms, including Cambrian relics as well as the new taxa of the Ordovician origin, constitute a fossil Liexi fauna, preserved in the Lower Ordovician Madaoyu Formation of Hunan, South China. Fossil specimens include bryozoans, sponges, echinoderms, polychaetes, graptolites, trilobites and conodonts. Palaeoscolecidan worms, including Liexiscolex and a possible Ottoia specimen, are of great interest. Early Ordovician priapulids, similar to their Cambrian predecessors, are also known from northern China.

In the deep-water sediments of the Early Ordovician (Floian) Al Rose Formation in the Inyo Mountains, California, the trilobite fauna have been discovered. Despite the low species diversity, this fauna is unique due to differences in the composition of families from more eastern complexes of the comparable age. Fossils identified as belonging to the Globampyx, Protopresbynileus, Carolinites, Cloacaspis, Geragnostus and Hintzeia genera. In the Early Ordovician, this territory was located near the paleocontinent of Laurentia.

== Mineral resources ==
Oil and gas exploration is underway in the Early Ordovician Tongzi and Meitan formations in Sichuan Basin and the Early Ordovician strata of the Tarim Basin, China. In the Lower Ordovician of the Tarim Basin near Tazhong, oil accumulations are found at depths of up to 9000 m.
