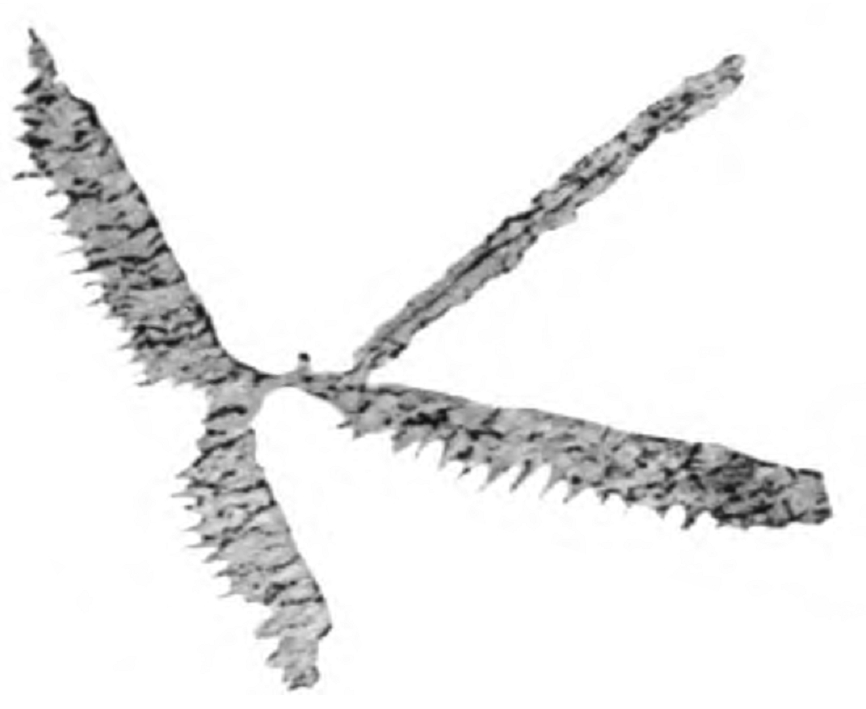
- Tetragraptus serra

Scientific classification
- Kingdom: Animalia
- Phylum: Hemichordata
- Class: Pterobranchia
- Subclass: Graptolithina
- Order: †Graptoloidea
- Family: †Phyllograptidae
- Genus: †Tetragraptus; Salter, 1863

Type species
- †Graptolithus bryonoides J.Hall, 1858 (Junior synonym of †T. serra)

= Tetragraptus =

Tetragraptus Temporal range: Ordovician ~478–455 Ma

Genus of marine worm-like animals

Tetragraptus is an extinct genus of graptolites from the Ordovician period.

== Species ==
Valid species following Maletz (2023):

- Type species †Tetragraptus serra (Brongniart, 1828), originally Fucoides serra Brongniart, 1828
- †Tetragraptus bigsbyi (James Hall, 1865), originally Graptolithus bigsbyi Hall, 1865
- †Tetragraptus amii Elles & Wood, 1902
- †Tetragraptus reclinatus Elles & Wood, 1902
- †Tetragraptus phyllograptoides Strandmark, 1902
- †Tetragraptus cor (Strandmark, 1902), originally Phyllograptus cor Strandmark, 1902
- †Tetragraptus gerhardi Maletz, 2023
