= Cabrières Biota =

Ordovician Lagerstätte in France

- Stratigraphic range: early late Floian; ~473 Ma
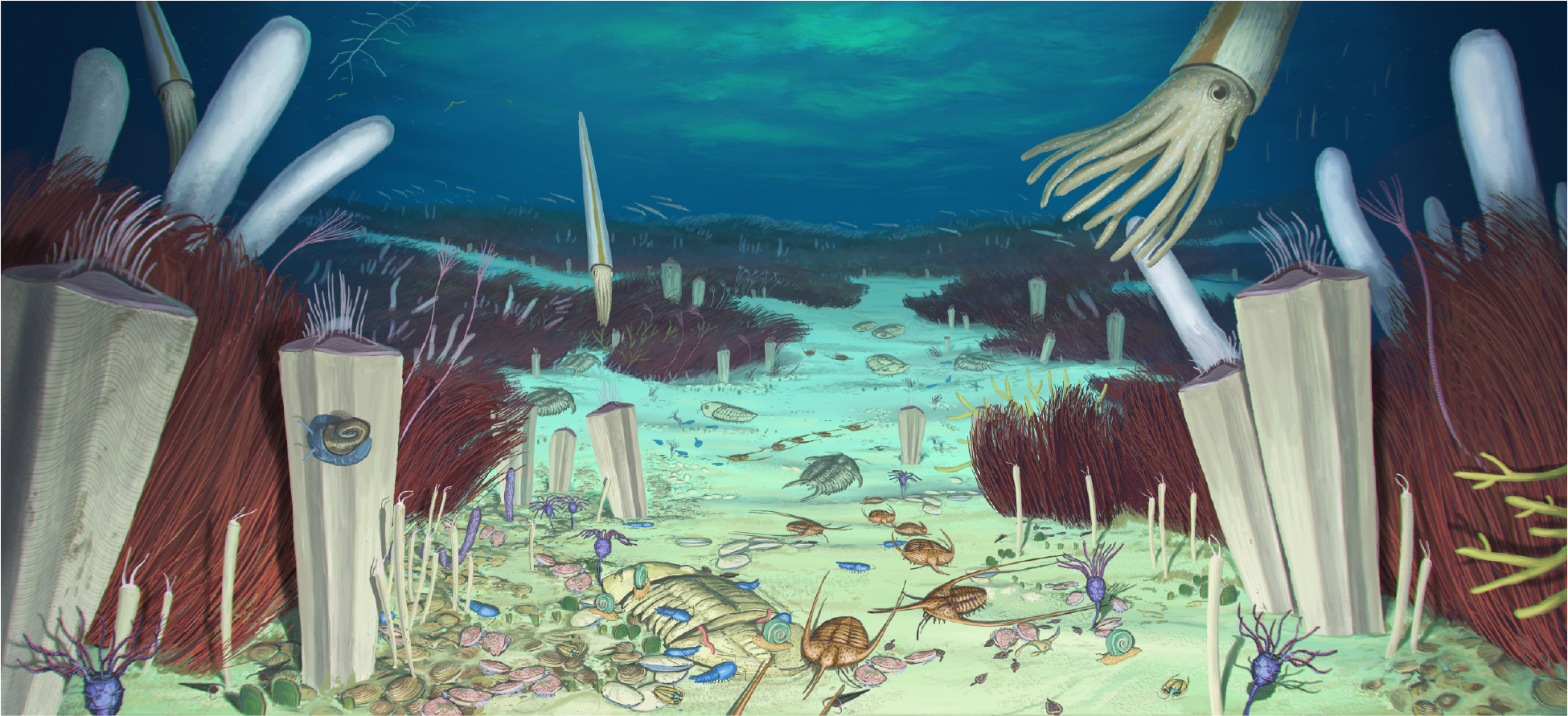
- Artistic reconstruction of the Cabrières Biota
- Type: Konservat-Lagerstätte
- Unit of: Landeyran Formation
- Thickness: 1 meter

Lithology
- Primary: Mudstone, Siltstone
- Other: Sandstone

Location
- Coordinates: 43°34′41″N 3°21′48″E
- Region: Occitania
- Country: France

Type section
- Named for: Cabrières, France
- Named by: Farid Saleh et al.
- Year defined: 2024
- Cabrières Biota (France)

The Cabrières Biota (French pronunciation: [kabʁijɛʁ]) is in part a Konservat-Lagerstätte (a fossil site noted for its exceptional preservation of fossils) located near Cabrières village in Hérault, southern France. It preserves a diverse biota dating back to the Floian stage of the early Ordovician. It is part of the Landeyran Formation. Exceptional soft-tissue preservation is known from this Lagerstätte. The biota inhabited a wave-influenced delta environment. Exceptional preservation occurs in the deeper prodeltaic (the offshore zone in front of the delta) waters.

== History ==
The area around Cabrières was recognized as an important region for its Paleozoic geologic interest in France by the Société Géologique de France after a field excursion in Hérault in 1868. The participants of this excursion discovered abundant trilobite fossils and noted the large number of horizons accumulated within a narrow space in the Pic de Vissou. The area around Cabrières became a reference for the Paleozoic in France. Furthermore, the presence of Armorican sandstones was also reported near Cabrières. By the end of the nineteenth century, debates arose about the stratigraphy of the area. Some authors suggested that the Armorican beds represented the transition between the Cambrian and the "Silurian" (strata now placed within the Ordovician were formerly categorized as being Silurian). However, other works contested this. They argued that the beds lay above strata accepted as belonging to the Arenig (equivalent to the Floian) and so, that they had to be younger. Later authors realized why the stratigraphy of Cabrières was so complex. They found the strata within the Pic de Vissou were overturned and deformed by tectonic activity. Upon realization, a more accurate stratigraphic series could be established, and strata from the Cabrières region were assigned to the Arenig.

From the 1930s to the mid-20th century, the natural sciences teacher Marcel Thoral published several works on the geology and paleontology of the Montagne Noire, including Cabrières. In the second half of the 20th century and the beginning of the 21st century, detailed studies of the fossils of the Landeyran Formation were published, including those of Dean (1966), Courtessole et al. (1981 and 1991), Babin et al. (1982), Vizcaïno & Lefebvre (1999) and Vizcaïno et al. (2001).

The site that would become known as the Cabrières Biota was discovered by Eric and Sylvie Monceret in 2018, after fieldwork in the area. Farid Saleh and Betrand Lefebvre were subsequently invited to the site to assist in specimen collection and identification. Over the next 3 years the team continued to do fieldwork on the site. Saleh et al., published the initial description of the biota in 2024. A reply paper by Muir & Botting later that year cast doubt on the identification of the biota as a Konservat-Lagerstätte, instead stating that the proposed non-arthropods represented trace fossils filled with fecal material. An additional reply to Muir & Bottling from the original authors refuted their claim and reaffirmed that the fossils preserved represented a soft-tissue Lagerstätte. In the same year, in his revision of the evolutionary origins of hemichordates, Jörg Maletz considered that the supposed specimen of the enteropneust tube Margaretia and some remains attributed to sponges from Cabrières were actually trace fossils. In 2026, further fossils were described which provided additional information on the diversity and environment of the site, while acknowledging that some of the specimens in the original paper were misidentified. Saleh and colleagues also argued that the term "Cabrières Biota" be expanded from that found in Saleh et al., (2024) to not only include the Lagerstätte site, but also other sites that are stratigraphically equivalent within the lower Landeyran Formation. Three other major sites beyond the Lagerstätte were attributed to the biota: The Landeyran River, Abandoned Vineyard, and Road Cut sites, all of which are near the Landeyran River between the towns of Causses-et-Veyran and St-Nazaire-de-Ladarez within the Mont Peyroux unit.

== Geology ==
The soft tissue preservation of the Cabrières Biota occurs within a 1 meter (3.3 ft) interval 15 meters (49 ft) above the base of the Landeyran Formation, which overlies the older Foulon Formation. The Landeyran Formation is the uppermost geological formation of the early Ordovician sequence of southern Montagne Noire. It is a 200 to 400 meters (660 to 1,310 ft) thick formation composed mainly of mudstone with siliceous nodules. The Cabrières Biota can be assigned to the Apatokephalus incisus trilobite biozone and the Baltograptus minutus graptolite biozone, which indicate an early late Floian age for the site.

=== Fossil preservation ===
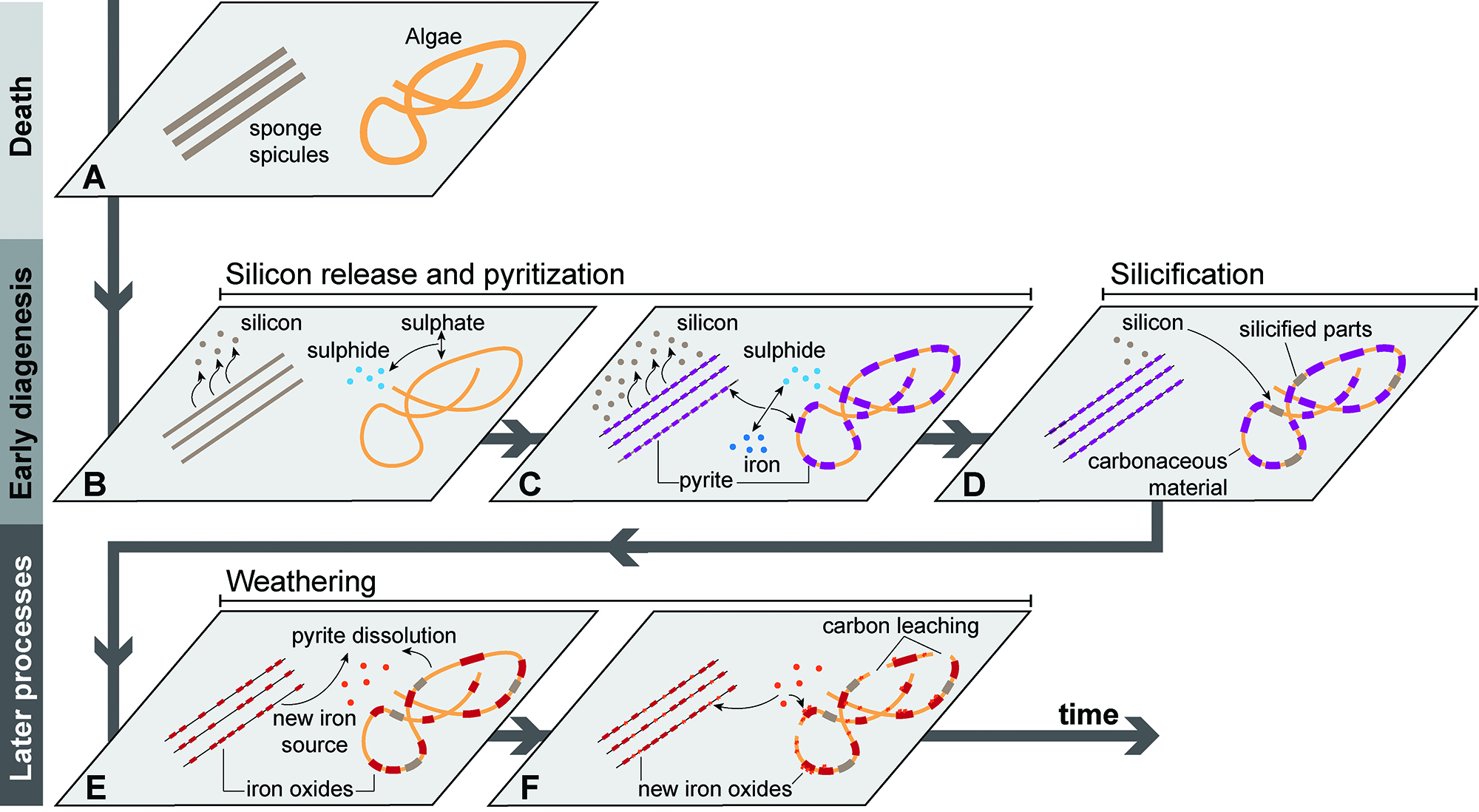
Chemical taphonomic pathway for fossils from the Early Ordovician Cabrières Biota.

The fossils are brown, red, or orange, and are embedded within mudstone and siltstone. Scanning electron microscopy (SEM) and energy-dispersive X-ray (EDX) analyses have shown that the fossils are composed of dense iron oxide crystals. Synchrotron-based investigations of the chemical speciation of iron further found that the iron was in the form of Fe(III). Furthermore, carbonized black films were also reported. Subsequent research on the sponge, algal, and vermiform organisms has shown a variety of different preservational modes within the Lagerstätte. Fossilized organisms all contain iron oxide minerals, which is similar to what Saleh et al. (2024) found. Additionally, a limited number of fossils also showed partial carbonization and silicification (replacement of soft tissues with carbon and silicon respectively). The morphology of some minerals suggests that the iron oxides might have been a result of early diagenetic pyrite precipitation, where organic matter was replaced by pyrite crystals. Pyritization of soft tissue fossils occurs with the reaction of sulfide and iron. During the decay of the soft tissues, before burial, hydrogen sulfide is produced by sulfate-reducing bacteria, which combines with Fe(II) ions made by iron-reducing bacteria to form monosulfides, which eventually crystalize into pyrite. The pyritization is incomplete in some fossils, which may be due to an insufficient supply of iron within the depositional environment. Pyritization is the principal mode of preservation in several Lagerstätten, such as Chengjiang, the Fezouata Formation and the Beecher's Trilobite Bed. The presence of partially silicified an carbonized fossils in addition to pyritized ones suggests a complex diagenetic process, where different material replaced the soft tissue due to changing conditions within the environment, such as a change in redox conditions.

== Paleoenvironment ==
=== Paleolatitude ===
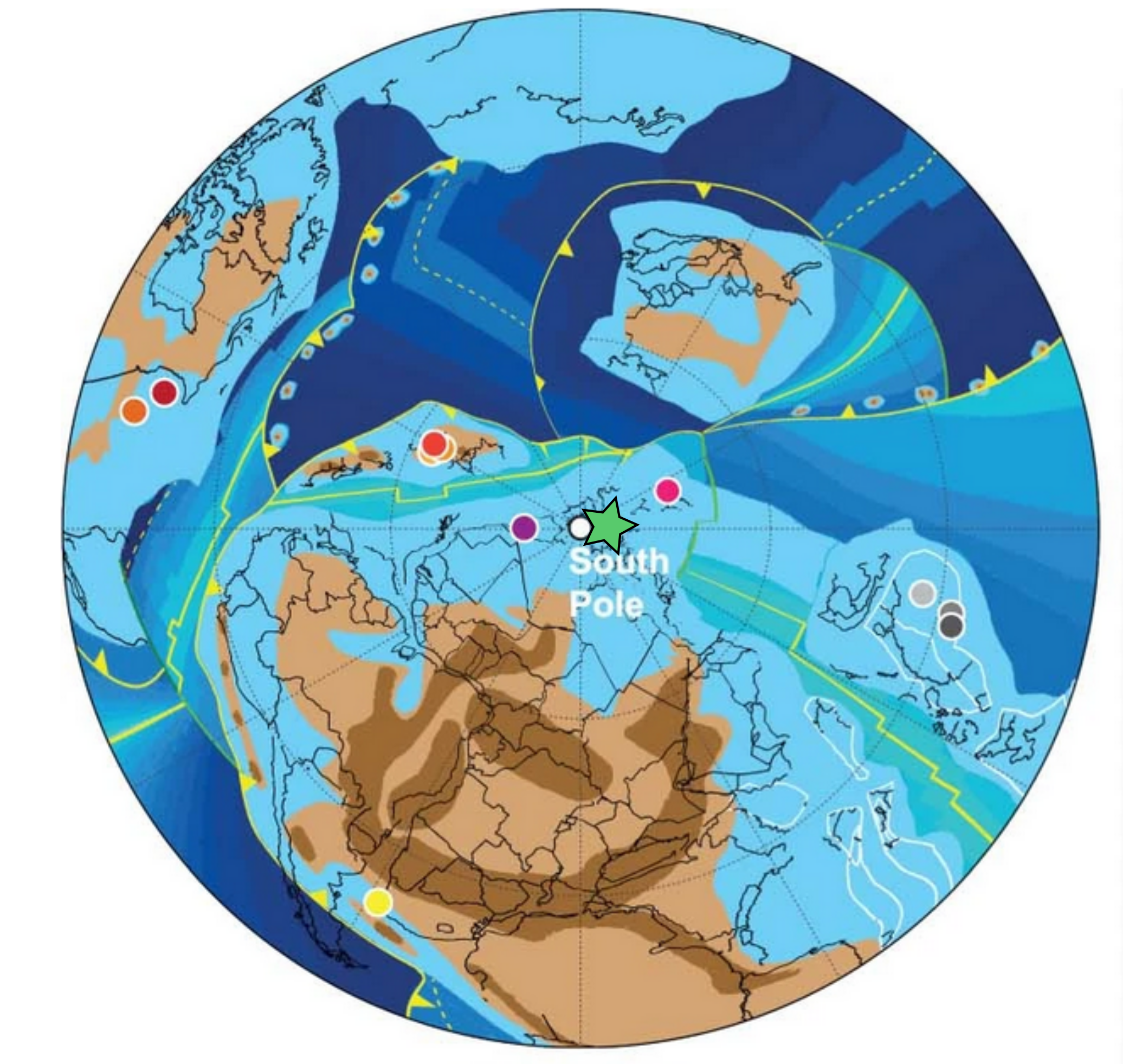
Location of the Cabrières Biota during the Floian (star) with other notable Ordovician sites marked by circles.

During the Floian, the Montagne Noire was located near the south pole. Of the other Early Ordovician polar biotas, such as the Fezouata Formation in Morocco, and the Klabava Formation from the Czech Republic, the Cabrières Biota was possibly the closest to the south pole during deposition. Saleh et al., (2024) hypothesized that during the Early Ordovician, polar sites represented a refuge from higher sea temperatures found within the lower latitudes. Furthermore, due to the diversity of fauna found within the Cabrières Biota that favorable oceanic currents could have influenced groups of organisms to migrate pole-ward.

The Cabrières Biota is dominated by algae and sponges, which is very similar to the make up of some modern polar ecosystems. The sponges in the biota specifically were noted as being able to grow to large sizes, which is similar to sponges in modern polar ecosystems. Saleh and colleagues said that while sponges also thrive in hypoxic environments, the diversity of other organisms preserved indicates that hypoxic conditions for the biota is unlikely. The diversity of arthropod remains at the site, however, is more comparable with that of more temperate environments, specifically being compared to the subarctic and low-arctic. The echinoderms present at the site is harder to interpret. Saleh and others said that while echinoderm diversity is lower in polar regions in modern ecosystems, places within polar settings can still show large numbers of them. So the relative low proportion of echinoderms is consistent with polar regions, however other factors, such as the relatively high diversity of echinoderms found elsewhere within the Montagne Noire. They hypothesize that due to the higher diversity of animals present within the biota, echinoderms faced more competition and were less likely to dominate the ecosystem, while other sites within the region were less diverse and therefore allowed for echinoderms to colonize in large numbers. Similar evidence was reported from the Fezouata formation, where echinoderms can be found regularly within certain layers where other animals were less diverse. Finally, the Cabrières Biota was noted as containing no bryozoans; notably, bryozoans are more commonly found within tropical and temperate waters. This lack of bryozoans does distinguish the biota from the nearby Klabava Formation, which while also being a high latitude environment, does contain bryozoans.

=== Depositional environment ===
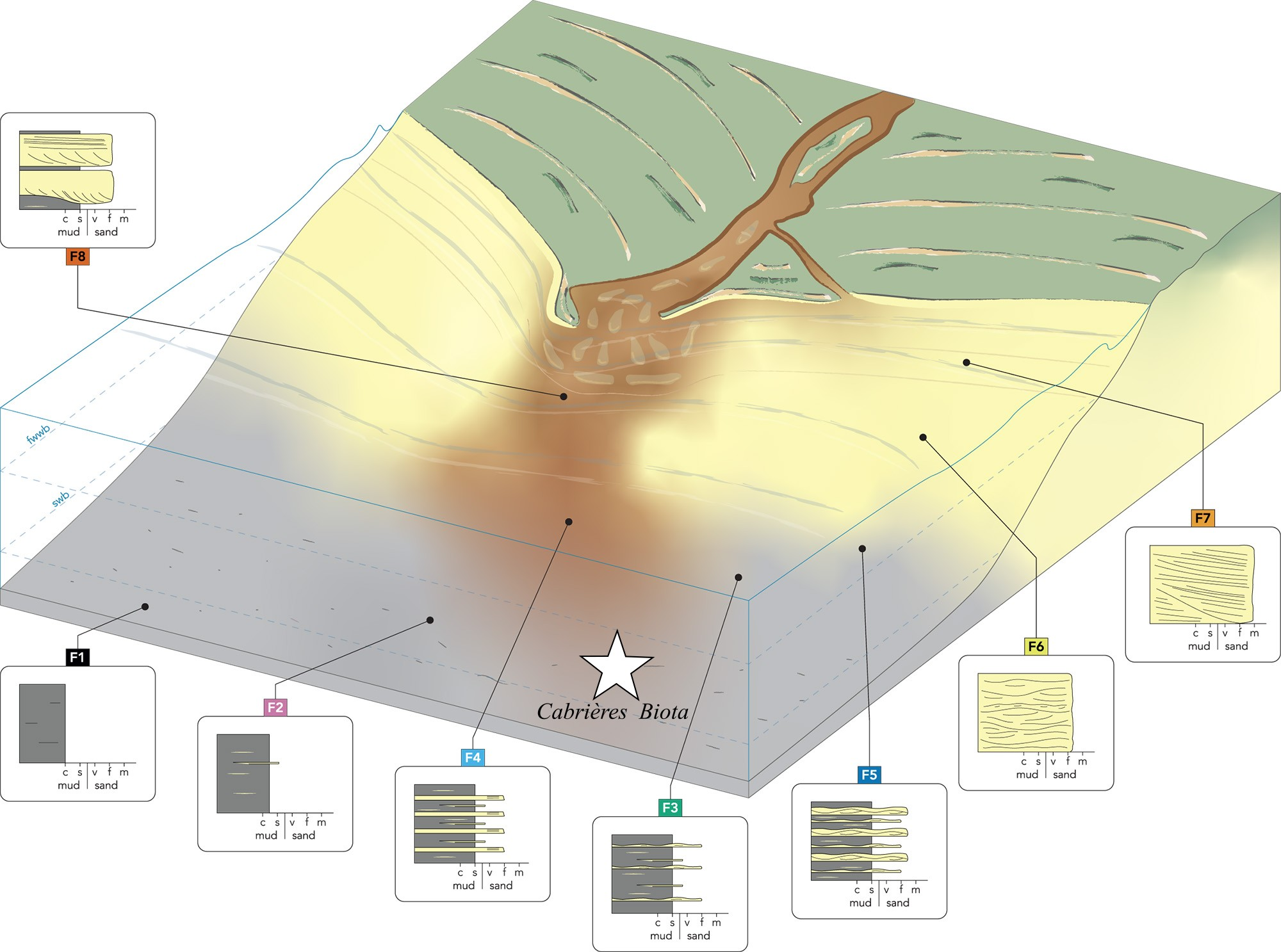
Visualization of the depositional environments in the Cabrières area. The Biota proper is located in the F2 Facies.

In 2026, Vaucher and colleagues further investigated the depositional environment of the larger sequence within the Mont Peyroux unit, since the Pic de Vissou unit, which contains the Cabrières Biota, was harder to collect data from due to extensive foliage cover. The studied section contains the Cluse de l'Orb, Foulon, and Landeyran Formations, which allowed for a broader understanding of the environmental context of the biota itself. They found 8 distinct sedimentary facies in the site (F1-F8), which were grouped into two broad assemblages, distal shallow marine facies (F1-F5), and proximal shallow marine facies (F6-F8). They defined distal facies as occurring below the mean storm wave base, while proximal, or "coastal" facies occurred above the mean storm wave base.

==== Distal shallow marine facies ====
F1 and F2 consist primarily of mudstones, indicating settling of mud and silt from suspension. F2 shows lenticular bedding, which indicates that the section was impacted by low density turbidity currents. Due to these factors, the authors hypothesized that F1 was a shallow shelf environment not affected by the delta, while F2 represented the edge of the prodelta, where storms would rarely transport sand into the deposit. F3 and F4 contain more siltstones, but also have a higher concentration of sandstone. For F3, the authors noted that the amount was consisting with the edges of areas impacted by river deposition, or possibly storm conditions. F4, indicated an environment closer to the source of the delta, with a lower amount of density currents. F5 alternates between siltstone and sandstone. Unlike F4, which was dominated by river deposition, F5 was more indicative of a deposit influenced by storms near shore without deltaic influence, containing finely laminated siltstones and sandstones with evidence of scouring. The authors note that F3-F5 were deposited at roughly the same elevation, with the differences shown being more indicative of the relation to the prodelta rather than depth.

==== Proximal shallow marine facies ====
F6 consists of brown sandstone with evidence of wave ripples, and hummocky cross-stratified sandstone, which the authors hypothesize as belonging to a lower shoreface setting. F7, on the other hand, preserves low-angled cross-stratified sandstones, which are more indicative of a upper shoreface or foreshore setting. F7 also preserves large erosional surfaces which Vaucher and colleagues hypothesize indicate phases of erosion from storm events interacting with the shoreline. Finally, F8 shows sharp-based to channel deposits and interbedding with sandstone and siltstone. Within F8 there are evidence of mud drapes (when layers of mud overlay sand), while the sandstone preserves evidence of convolute beddings (when soft sediment is complexly deformed, usually associated with floodplains, deltas, or intertidal flats). This information is consistent with the facies belonging to a delta front with possible tidal influence.

Below are the sediment facies identified in Vaucher et al., (2026) and their environmental interpretation. Facies with exceptional preservation are marked with "★".

Facies	Description	Environment
F1 ★	Massive to laminated siltstone	Shelf
F2 ★	Laminated siltstone with lenticular bedding	Distal prodelta to offshore
F3	Siltstone-prone and cross-stratified sandstone	Proximal wave-influenced prodelta
F4	Siltstone-prone and planar-laminated sandstone	Proximal prodelta
F5	Heterolithic cross-stratified sandstone and siltstone	Proximal offshore
F6	Amalgamated hummocky cross-stratified sandstone	Lower shoreface
F7	Low-angle cross-stratified sandstone	Upper shoreface to foreshore
F8	Tabular massive to trough cross-stratified sandstone	Delta front

== Paleobiota ==
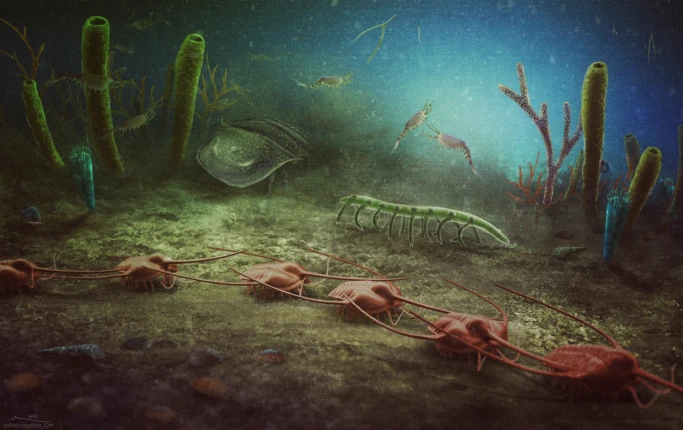
Artistic reconstruction of the Cabrières Biota. Some aspects are outdated: phyllocarids swimming in the background were reinterpreted as rostroconch molluscs. The hemichordate Margaretia on the right in the background was also reinterpreted. The Sphenothallus-like cnidarians in blue are inaccurately reconstructed (wrong shape of the periderm and wrong number of tentacles).

The Cabrières Biota preserves a wide variety of biomineralized and non-biomineralized organisms of various groups. The biota contains a particularly large quantity of algae and sponges, alongside acritarchs, arthropods, brachiopods, cnidarians, echinoderms, hemichordates, molluscs, vermiform organisms and trace fossils. Notably, unlike other Ordovician biotas, bryozoans are absent. The abundance of these groups provides insights into the paleoenvironment and paleoecology of the site, and allows for comparisons with other early Ordovician assemblages, such as the Fezouata Formation.

Taxonomic lists of the Cabrières Biota after Saleh, Geriau, & Lefebvre (2026). The lists include both taxa from the main Lagerstätte sites and those of stratigraphically equivalent localities within the lower Landeyran Formation.

Color key: Taxon / Reclassified taxon / Taxon falsely reported as present / Dubious taxon or junior synonym / Ichnotaxon / Ootaxon / Morphotaxon

Notes
Uncertain or tentative taxa are in small text
~~crossed out~~ taxa are discredited.

=== Acritarchs ===
Abundant acritarch remains were discovered in the lower part of the Landeyran Formation. Acritarcha is an informal group of palynomorphs, generally interpreted as the remains of marine microphytoplankton, whose biological affinities are uncertain or unknown. As a result, Acritarcha does not constitute a biological clade, but rather a practical grouping based on morphology. Acritarchs are commonly classified into several morphogroups defined by simple morphological features. The assemblage is dominated by polygonomorphs, which represent around 30% of the specimens recovered at the site. Of the polygonomorphs, taxa such as Polygonium, and galeates, make up about 35% of the total diversity, while other taxa, such as Caldariola, Cymatiogalea, Priscogalea and Stelliferidium account for the other remainder. However, the proportion of the polygonomorphs diminishes toward the top of the Cabrières Biota. This decrease in proportion of the overall fauna coincides with the appearance of other genera: namely the spinose Baltisphaeridium, and the striated, rectangular-shaped Striatotheca. The latter genus being almost entirely absent in the bottom of the section. Other rarer groups, such as the diacromorphs (which make up between 4-9% of the biota) and the sphaeromorphs (which make up between 5-6%) do not clearly vary in abundance throughout the section. The genus Micrhystridium is present in similar proportions to that of the sphaeromorphs, follows the same decrease in diversity over the biota as galeates. Several other genera of acritarchs, such as Pirea, Dasydorus and Peteinosphaeridium are present in this assemblage but are "rare" to "very rare".

Several taxa of the Cabrières Biota assemblage show clear variations of proportion between the top and the bottom of the section; this change in morphology reflect differences in paleoenvironmental condition throughout the biota. For example, it is accepted that smooth-walled acritarchs such as sphaeromorphs were more abundant in shallow waters, while higher diversity taxa such as Polygonium and Micrhystridium were more typical of open marine environments. Furthermore, highly ornamented taxa, such as Baltisphaeridium, were more common in deeper waters. In the lower Landeyran Formation assemblage, nearshore taxa are present, but uncommon. The assemblage is dominated by polygonomorphs and galeates but these groups decrease while taxa such as Baltisphaeridium become more abundant (already said earlier in the paragraph consider combining these sentences). The change in the composition of the assemblage, from more taxa typical of inner-shelf environments in the lower part of the section to more taxa typical of deeper and more distal waters toward the top, suggests a transition from relatively shallow coastal waters to deeper offshore environments. This trend agrees with the sedimentological data. This assemblage is typical of the peri-Gondwana acritarch province. Specifically, the site is most similar to the Mediterranean subprovince and furthermore shares many comparisons with Bohemian biotas.

Genus	Species	Notes	Image
Acanthodiacrodium	A. angustizonale		Scale bar = 10 μm. A, Arbusculidium filamentosum B, Arbusculidium filamentosum C, Arbusculidium sp. D, Barakella sp. E, Barakella cf. felix F, Acanthodiacrodium sp. G, Acanthodiacrodium cf. angustizonale H, Acanthodiacrodium sp. I, Acanthodiacrodium angustum J, Coryphidium bohemicum K, Coryphidium minutum L, Striatotheca principalis var. parva M, Striatotheca principalis var. parva N, Veryhachium lairdii group O, Veryhachium trispinosum group P, Aureotesta clathrata var. simple Q, Aureotesta clathrata var. simplex. R, Polygonium gracile S, Stellechinatum uncinatum T, Pirea ornata U, Pirea ornata V, Pirea sp. Scale bar = 10 μm. A, Pterospermella sp. B, Baltisphaeridium klabavense C, Baltisphaeridium sp. D, Cymatiogalea cf. granulata E, Cymatiogalea cuvillieri F, Cymatiogalea cf. granulata G, Cymatiogalea messaoudensis H, Cymatiogalea cf. granulata I, Stelliferidium cf. trifidum J, Stelliferidium sp. K, Stelliferidium sp. L, Ampullula cf. crassula M, Peteinosphaeridium armatum N, Peteinosphaeridium robustiramusum O, Rhopaliophora palmata P, Rhopaliophora cf. palmata Q, Vogtlandia cf. multiradialis R, Vogtlandia multiradialis S, cf. Adorfia hoffmanensis
Acanthodiacrodium	A. angustum		
Acanthodiacrodium	A. sp.		
Adorfia	A. hoffmanensis		
Ampullula	A. crassula		
Arbusculidium	A. filamentosum		
Arbusculidium	A. sp.		
Aureotesta	A. clathrata var. clathrata		
Aureotesta	A. clathrata var. simplex		
Baltisphaeridium	B. klavabense		
Barakella	B. felix		
Barakella	B. sp.		
Caldariola	C. spp.		
Coryphidium	C. bohemicum		
Coryphidium	C. elegans		
Coryphidium	C. minutum		
Cymatiogalea	C. cuvillieri		
Cymatiogalea	C. deunffii		
Cymatiogalea	C. granulata		
Cymatiogalea	C. messaoudensis		
Dasydorus	D. sp.		
Eupokilofusa	E. spp.		
Leiosphaeridia	L. spp.		
Michrystridium	M. spp.		
cf. Petaloferidium	cf. P. florigerum		
Peteinosphaeridium	P. armatum		
Peteinosphaeridium	P. rubustriramosum		
Peteinosphaeridium	P. sp		
Pirea	P. ornata		
Pirea	P. sp.		
Poikilofusa	P. spp.		
Polygonium	P. gracile		
Priscogalea	P. spp.		
Pterospermella	P. sp.		
Rhopaliophora	R. palmata		
Rhopaliophora	R. sp.		
Stellechinatum	S. sicaforme		
Stellechinatum	S. uncinatum		
Stelliferidium	S. trifidum		
Striatotheca	S. principalis var. parva		
Tectitheca	T. additionalis		
Veryhachium	V. lairdii group		
Veryhachium	V. trispinosum group		
Vogtlandia	V. cf. flosmaris		
Vogtlandia	V. multiradialis		

=== Algae ===
Algae are a dominant component of the Cabrières Biota. They are dominated by a type of macroscopic unbranching tubular morphotype. The morphology of these algae is similar to the vendotaenids. The vendotaenids are typical of the Proterozoic. The filaments of the Cabrières Biota lack diagnostic morphological features that would allow for a precise identification, thus, it is likely that the similarities between the filamentous algae of the Cabrières Biota and the vendotaenids of the Proterozoic may have been convergent rather than inherited from a common ancestry. These algal fossils show that the early Ordovician polar ecosystem of the Cabrières Biota had significant similarities with Precambrian flora. Other rarer and yet undescribed branching morphologies of algae have been discovered in the Cabrières Biota.

Genus	Species	Notes	Image
indet. alga		Compact macroalga with branches and nodes.	
indet. alga		Thick branching macroalga.	
indet. alga		Thin branching macroalga.	
indet. alga		Ediacaran-type Vendotaenia-like macroalga.	

=== Sponges ===
Sponges are less abundant than algae but still an important component of the Cabrières Biota. Four morphotypes of hexactinellids (glass sponges) have been described to date. They can be assigned to Hintzespongiidae and Protospongiidae and they may represent unknown groups. These sponges are usually large and tubular to vasiform. Root tufts have also been discovered. The root tufts show a similarity with those of brachiospongiids (a hexactinellid family found from the late Ordovician to the Silurian). The sponges of the Cabrières Biota exhibit characteristics of both Cambrian protospongiid species and later Paleozoic species. The presence of long root tufts in sponges indicates that they inhabited soft-substrate. A similar abundance of sponges is observed in modern polar ecosystems. They can reach large sizes similarly to what is observed in the Cabrières Biota. Sponges typically thrive in poorly oxygenated waters; however this was likely not the case for the Cabrières Biota because low oxygen environments are usually associated with low diversity, whereas the Cabrières Biota exhibits a wide range of organisms.

Genus	Species	Notes	Image
Hintzespongiidae? indet. 1		Large, thin-walled, vasiform or tubular sponge. Up to 94 mm tall. It may represent a previously unknown taxon.	
Hintzespongiidae? indet. 2		Slender, tubular, incomplete individual with probably thin wall. Up to 40 mm tall. It may represent a previously unknown taxon.	
Hintzespongiidae? indet. 3		Large, slender, thin-walled tubular sponge over 96 mm tall, however, its apex and base remain undetermined due to poor preservation of the extremities. It may represent a previously unknown taxon.	
Protospongiidae? indet.		Disarticulated spicule assemblage.	

=== Cnidarians ===
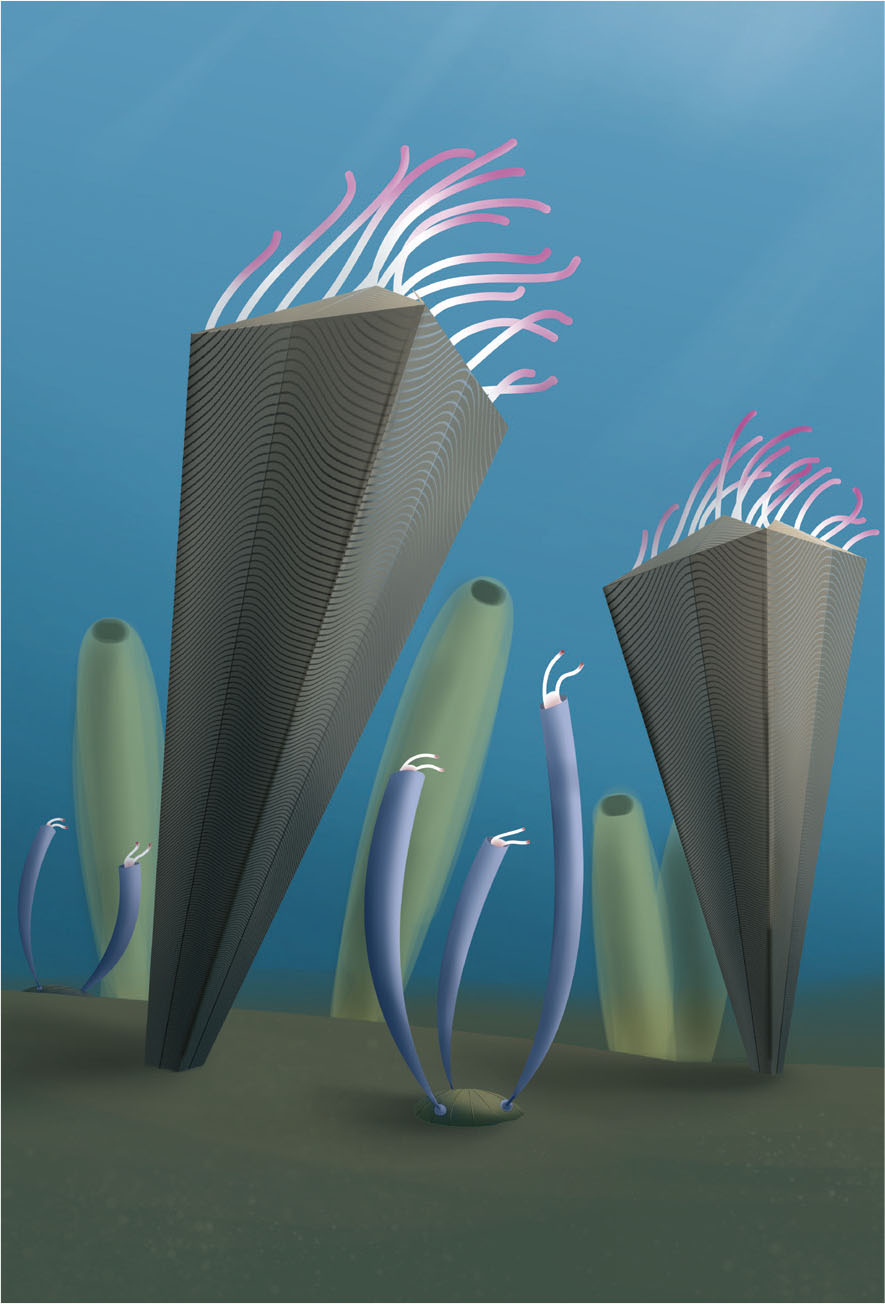
Artistic reconstruction of two large Archaeoconularia insignis, smaller Sphenothallus sp. attached to brachiopod valves, and sponges in the background.

The cnidarians of the Cabrières Biota are represented by polypoid medusozoans. Only the hard parts are known, consisting of lamellar periderms that covered most of the soft body. Two taxa have been identified: the conulariid Archaeoconularia insignis and the problematic Sphenothallus sp. The tubular periderm of Sphenothallus expands at very low angles in width toward the oral opening. Some specimens discovered in the Cabrières Biota reached approximately 52 mm in length; however, they are incomplete and the original lengths of the tubes were estimated at about 60 mm. The largest specimens of Archaeoconularia insignis from the Cabrières Biota are estimated to have reached 150–200 mm in length, making them much larger than Sphenothallus sp.

It is unclear whether the cnidarians of the Cabrières Biota were epibenthic (attached to hard substrates) or partially infaunal (with their base embedded in sediments) because of the absence of apical ends in the fossils. There is also no evidence that the medusozoans of the Cabrières Biota were epibiontic, with the exception of one Sphenothallus sp. from a locality separate from the main Cabrières Biota site in the lower Landeyran Formation that is likely attached to a rhynchonelliform brachiopod. Some tubes of Sphenothallus sp. are overlapping each other or are closely associated; however, it is still unknown whether this reflects life clustering or post-mortem transport. Ordovician medusozoans are known to have served as hard substrates for epibiont animals in some biotas; however, despite some tubes of the Cabrières Biota associated with mollusc and brachiopod shells, there is no unequivocal evidence that these organisms were epibionts on the cnidarians. Thanks to exceptionally well-preserved fossils from the Devonian Hunsrück Slate in Germany, we know that Sphenothallus was equipped with two tentacles at the oral end. By analogy with modern cnidarians, Archaeoconularia insignis likely had tentacles. Despite possibly being partially embedded in the substrate, A. insignis may have been the tallest benthic animal of the Cabrières Biota, taller than the sponges. By analogy, Early Ordovician medusozoans may have fed on diverse prey ranging from eggs, ciliates and dinoflagellates to small crustaceans, various larvae, small invertebrates and possibly larval conodonts.

Genus	Species	Notes	Image
Archaeoconularia	A. insignis	A member of Conulariida.	
Sphenothallus	S. sp.	A problematic medusozoan.	

=== Echinoderms ===
Echinoderms were found to be extremely rare in the Cabrières Biota by Saleh et al. (2024). Even though they are still considered a rare component of the Cabrières Biota, the study of additional material from other sites of the Cabrières Lagerstätte and material from other sites and horizons of the Montagne Noire reveal important echinoderm assemblages and complex paleoenvironmental implications for the Cabrières Biota. The scarce assemblage of the Cabrières Lagerstätte is composed of few specimens and at least six taxa (the rhombiferan Macrocystella sp., the eocrinoids Balantiocystis sp., Rhipidocystidae indet., the cornutes Nanocarpus dolambii, Thoralicystis? ubaghsi and the mitrate Ovocarpus moncereti). Complete and articulated specimens of Balantiocystis and Macrocystella have been discovered, this preservation was likely allowed by rapid burial, as is the case in most Lagerstätten. However, contrasting with the Cabrières Lagerstätte, the entire lower Landeyran Formation has yielded abundant and diverse echinoderm remains belonging to sixteen taxa. This larger assemblage is dominated by the cornute Nanocarpus dolambii alongside the relatively common cornutes Thoralicystis melchiori, T.? ubaghsi, the crinoid Ramseyocrinus vizcainoi, the mitrates Lagynocystis pyramidalis and Ovocarpus moncereti, the rhombiferan Macrocystella sp. and undercribed ophiuroids and eocrinoids.

The lower Landeyran Formation assemblage (Cabrières Biota) likely inhabited soft substrates in a distal and quiet environment below the storm-wave base. The specimens of this assemblage are unusually small on average. Many stylophorans have a theca of only 3 to 10 mm. For example: the mitrate Lagynocystis pyramidalis of the lower Landeyran assemblage is approximately half the size of the specimens from Bohemia (middle Ordovician Šárka Formation) and in Brittany (middle Ordovician Pierre Melière Formation). However, the echinoderms of the Fezouata Shale are also very small. Size reduction is often associated with stressful environmental conditions such as storms, predation, oligotrophy and low oxygenation. Storm influence on the seafloor was limited in the deep facies of the lower Landeyran Formation, and so storms can be excluded from the factors causing the size reduction of the echinoderms. Predation is also unlikely to have caused this size reduction, as no particular increase in cephalopod (main predators of the Ordovician) abundance is observed. The high abundance of acritarchs in the Cabrières Biota also excludes the oligotrophy. Therefore, the most likely cause of the size reduction of the echinoderms is dysoxic conditions within the seafloor and possibly at the seafloor surface too, as suggested by the ichnological data. The appearance of the mitrate Lagynocystis pyramidalis, systematically associated with dysoxic conditions, in the Landeyran Formation, supports this interpretation.

Although the relative scarcity of echinoderms in the particular Cabrières Lagerstätte could be explained by the polar conditions of the Cabrières Biota, polar ecosystems can host abundant echinoderms and other diverse assemblages from the Montagne Noire including the lower Landeyran assemblage (Cabrières Biota) suggest that other factors were responsible for the low abundance of echinoderms in the Cabrières Lagerstätte. Early Paleozoic stylophoran echinoderms are often found in low-diversity assemblage beds where they are the dominant taxon, whereas they are rarer in high-diversity assemblages dominated by other groups such as brachiopods, molluscs and trilobites. It has been suggested that, by analogy with some modern dense populations of ophiuroids, that dense, low-diversity echinoderm beds in the Fezouata Shale resulted from oligotrophic conditions, suggesting that echinoderms were opportunistic and thrived in areas inhospitable for other taxa. However, this was not confirmed because of the abundant and diverse palynomorph assemblages in the entire Fezouata Shale, thus supporting the hypothesis regarding the reduction in size, dwarf stylophoran-dominated assemblages might have occurred in dysoxic environments. Concerning the lower Landeyran Formation assemblage, in a possibly similar way as in the Fezouata Shale, echinoderms were scarce in the high-diversity assemblage that the Cabrières Lagerstätte was because of unfavorable conditions (such as bathymetry) and strong competition, whereas they thrived in nearby environments more hospitable for echinoderms and less hospitable for most other taxa.

Genus	Species	Notes	Image
Ampelocarpus	A. landeyranensis	A cornute.	A, Macrocystella sp. (Glyptocystitida). B, Balantiocystis sp. (Eocrinoidea). C, rhipidocystid indet. (Eocrinoidea). D, Ovocarpus moncereti (Mitrata). E, Nanocarpus dolambii (Cornuta).
Anatifopsis	A. sp.	A mitrate.	A, Macrocystella sp. (Glyptocystitida). B, Balantiocystis sp. (Eocrinoidea). C, rhipidocystid indet. (Eocrinoidea). D, Ovocarpus moncereti (Mitrata). E, Nanocarpus dolambii (Cornuta).
Balanocystites	B. aff. primus	A mitrate.	A, Macrocystella sp. (Glyptocystitida). B, Balantiocystis sp. (Eocrinoidea). C, rhipidocystid indet. (Eocrinoidea). D, Ovocarpus moncereti (Mitrata). E, Nanocarpus dolambii (Cornuta).
Balantiocystis	B. sp.	An eocrinoid.	A, Macrocystella sp. (Glyptocystitida). B, Balantiocystis sp. (Eocrinoidea). C, rhipidocystid indet. (Eocrinoidea). D, Ovocarpus moncereti (Mitrata). E, Nanocarpus dolambii (Cornuta).
Lagynocystis	L. pyramidalis	A mitrate.	A, Macrocystella sp. (Glyptocystitida). B, Balantiocystis sp. (Eocrinoidea). C, rhipidocystid indet. (Eocrinoidea). D, Ovocarpus moncereti (Mitrata). E, Nanocarpus dolambii (Cornuta).
Lingulocystis	L. elongata	An eocrinoid.	A, Macrocystella sp. (Glyptocystitida). B, Balantiocystis sp. (Eocrinoidea). C, rhipidocystid indet. (Eocrinoidea). D, Ovocarpus moncereti (Mitrata). E, Nanocarpus dolambii (Cornuta).
Lyricocarpus	L. courtessolei	A cornute.	A, Macrocystella sp. (Glyptocystitida). B, Balantiocystis sp. (Eocrinoidea). C, rhipidocystid indet. (Eocrinoidea). D, Ovocarpus moncereti (Mitrata). E, Nanocarpus dolambii (Cornuta).
Macrocystella	M. sp.	A rhombiferan.	A, Macrocystella sp. (Glyptocystitida). B, Balantiocystis sp. (Eocrinoidea). C, rhipidocystid indet. (Eocrinoidea). D, Ovocarpus moncereti (Mitrata). E, Nanocarpus dolambii (Cornuta).
Nanocarpus	N. dolambii	A cornute.	A, Macrocystella sp. (Glyptocystitida). B, Balantiocystis sp. (Eocrinoidea). C, rhipidocystid indet. (Eocrinoidea). D, Ovocarpus moncereti (Mitrata). E, Nanocarpus dolambii (Cornuta).
Ophiuroidea	indet.		A, Macrocystella sp. (Glyptocystitida). B, Balantiocystis sp. (Eocrinoidea). C, rhipidocystid indet. (Eocrinoidea). D, Ovocarpus moncereti (Mitrata). E, Nanocarpus dolambii (Cornuta).
Ovocarpus	O. moncereti	A mitrate.	A, Macrocystella sp. (Glyptocystitida). B, Balantiocystis sp. (Eocrinoidea). C, rhipidocystid indet. (Eocrinoidea). D, Ovocarpus moncereti (Mitrata). E, Nanocarpus dolambii (Cornuta).
Ramseyocrinus	R. vizcainoi	A crinoid.	A, Macrocystella sp. (Glyptocystitida). B, Balantiocystis sp. (Eocrinoidea). C, rhipidocystid indet. (Eocrinoidea). D, Ovocarpus moncereti (Mitrata). E, Nanocarpus dolambii (Cornuta).
Rhenopyrgus	R. sp.	An edrioasteroid.	A, Macrocystella sp. (Glyptocystitida). B, Balantiocystis sp. (Eocrinoidea). C, rhipidocystid indet. (Eocrinoidea). D, Ovocarpus moncereti (Mitrata). E, Nanocarpus dolambii (Cornuta).
Thoralicystis	T. melchiori	A cornute.	A, Macrocystella sp. (Glyptocystitida). B, Balantiocystis sp. (Eocrinoidea). C, rhipidocystid indet. (Eocrinoidea). D, Ovocarpus moncereti (Mitrata). E, Nanocarpus dolambii (Cornuta).
Thoralicystis	T.? ubaghsi	A cornute.	A, Macrocystella sp. (Glyptocystitida). B, Balantiocystis sp. (Eocrinoidea). C, rhipidocystid indet. (Eocrinoidea). D, Ovocarpus moncereti (Mitrata). E, Nanocarpus dolambii (Cornuta).
Rhipidocystidae	indet.	An eocrinoid.	A, Macrocystella sp. (Glyptocystitida). B, Balantiocystis sp. (Eocrinoidea). C, rhipidocystid indet. (Eocrinoidea). D, Ovocarpus moncereti (Mitrata). E, Nanocarpus dolambii (Cornuta).

=== Hemichordates ===
The Cabrières biota contains a relatively poor-diversity graptolite assemblage, with five species including a possible planktic dendroid. The graptolites are preserved within laminated and fine-grained shales associated with a local 'Boutoury facies' in the Pic de Vissou tectonic unit of the Montagne Noire, and the preservation can vary from specimens preserved three-dimensionally as pyrite casts to flattened specimens preserved as mineral or carbon films. The most common graptolite in the assemblage is Baltograptus minutus, a didymograptid with pendent (strongly downward-curving) stipes and a slender sicula. The presence of B. minutus, along with the phyllograptid Pseudophyllograptus densus, shows that the Cabrières biota belongs to the late Floian B. minutus biozone. In addition, specimens similar to Baltograptus jacksoni, a didymograptid that characterizes the preceding B. jacksoni biozone but continues into the earliest B. minutus biozone, suggest that the age of the Cabrières biota could be more precisely estimated to the earliest late Floian.

The Baltograptus minutus biozone has been recognized in Bolivia, Peru, Morocco, and central and southwestern Europe. In addition, the zone contains faunas of the same age as the North American Didymograptellus bifidus biozone and similar units in Argentina, the South Chinese Didymograptellus eobifidus + Baltograptus "deflexus" biozone, and the lower portion of the British Avalonian Expansograptus simulans biozone.

The dichograptid Holograptus is common in both the Cabrières biota and in sites south and west of Cabrières (termed the Cabrières slivers) from the earlier Cymatograptus protobalticus biozone. Holograptus has a large, horizontally oriented colony and is typically associated with dense, cold-water settings, so its presence suggests that the Cabrières region had slightly deeper waters during the deposition of the Landeyran Formation than the type area of the formation in the Saint-Chinianais region. The Holograptus from the Cabrières biota are primarily fragments, which suggests that they were transported into a shallower, high-energy environment, while the specimens from the older Cabrières slivers are complete, suggesting a low-energy depositional environment.

Genus	Species	Notes	Image
Margaretia		Organic tubes of an Oesia-like enteropneust. However, the specimen from Cabrières is most likely a trace fossil.	
Baltograptus	B. minutus	A didymograptid graptolite.	A-E, Baltograptus minutus. F, Pseudophyllograptus densus. G, H, Baltograptus sp. I, J, Holograptus sp. K,L, Calyxdendrum? sp.
Baltograptus	B. sp. cf. jacksoni	A didymograptid graptolite.	A-E, Baltograptus minutus. F, Pseudophyllograptus densus. G, H, Baltograptus sp. I, J, Holograptus sp. K,L, Calyxdendrum? sp.
Calyxdendrum?	C.? sp.	A planktonic dendroid graptolite.	A-E, Baltograptus minutus. F, Pseudophyllograptus densus. G, H, Baltograptus sp. I, J, Holograptus sp. K,L, Calyxdendrum? sp.
Holograptus	H. sp.	A dichograptid graptolite.	A-E, Baltograptus minutus. F, Pseudophyllograptus densus. G, H, Baltograptus sp. I, J, Holograptus sp. K,L, Calyxdendrum? sp.
Pseudophyllograptus	P. densus	A phyllograptid graptolite.	A-E, Baltograptus minutus. F, Pseudophyllograptus densus. G, H, Baltograptus sp. I, J, Holograptus sp. K,L, Calyxdendrum? sp.

=== Hyoliths ===
as of 2026, only two hyoliths are known from lower Landeyran Formation, described by Vizcaïno and colleagues in 2001, prior to the naming of the Cabrières Biota. Saleh and colleages included these taxa due to them being laterally equivalent to the Lagerstätte.

Genus	Species	Notes	Image
Elegantilites	E. sp.		
Nephrotheca	N. guiraudi		

=== Molluscs ===
The mollusc assemblage of the Cabrières Biota is composed of bivalves, rostroconchs, gastropods, tergomyans and cephalopods. The main studied material comes from the Cabrières Lagerstätte. Additional material and species are known from other sites of the lower Landeyran Formation.

Bivalves of the Cabrières Lagerstätte are interpreted as infaunal (living in the sediments) to semi-infaunal filter feeding or deposit feeding burrowers. During the early Ordovician, bivalves were mostly restricted to inshore sedimentary environments of Gondwana. The bivalve assemblage of the Floian of Montagne Noire shares strong similarities in composition with coeval faunas in Morocco (Fezouata Formation). The dominance of heteroconchs and protobranchs in Montagne Noire has been suggested to be characteristic of high-latitude areas. Rostroconchs were diverse and widespread during the early Ordovician. Although many genera were restricted to low-latitudes, the genera Ribeiria and Tolmachovia have been found in high-latitude areas such as the Cabrières Biota. These two genera are thought to be infaunal burrowers. The tergomyans Carcassonnella and Thoralispira and the gastropod Lesueurilla are also known from the Fezouata Formation. Little is known about their ecology. Carcassonnella may have been an herbivore only partly buried in the sediments. Ordovician cephalopods were mostly slow-moving vertical migrants of the open water. The cephalopods of the Cabrières Biota have not been studied in detail yet; however, they show clear affinities with the cephalopod assemblages of the Fezouata Formation and of older formations in the Montagne Noire.

Genus	Species	Notes	Image
Indet. annulated orthocone		A cephalopod of uncertain affinities.	A-C. Thoralispira laevis. D-G. Carcassonnella vizcainoi A-E,G, I.Redonia michelae. F,H. Babinka prima A. Bathmoceras? sp. B. Indet. annulated orthocone. C. Indet. smooth orthocerid?
Babinka	B. prima	A bivalve.	A-C. Thoralispira laevis. D-G. Carcassonnella vizcainoi A-E,G, I.Redonia michelae. F,H. Babinka prima A. Bathmoceras? sp. B. Indet. annulated orthocone. C. Indet. smooth orthocerid?
Bathmoceras?	B.? sp.	A cephalopod.	A-C. Thoralispira laevis. D-G. Carcassonnella vizcainoi A-E,G, I.Redonia michelae. F,H. Babinka prima A. Bathmoceras? sp. B. Indet. annulated orthocone. C. Indet. smooth orthocerid?
Carcassonella	C. courtessolei	A tergomyan.	A-C. Thoralispira laevis. D-G. Carcassonnella vizcainoi A-E,G, I.Redonia michelae. F,H. Babinka prima A. Bathmoceras? sp. B. Indet. annulated orthocone. C. Indet. smooth orthocerid?
Coxiconchia	C. guiraudi	A bivalve.	A-C. Thoralispira laevis. D-G. Carcassonnella vizcainoi A-E,G, I.Redonia michelae. F,H. Babinka prima A. Bathmoceras? sp. B. Indet. annulated orthocone. C. Indet. smooth orthocerid?
Ekaterodonta	E. courtessolei	A bivalve.	A-C. Thoralispira laevis. D-G. Carcassonnella vizcainoi A-E,G, I.Redonia michelae. F,H. Babinka prima A. Bathmoceras? sp. B. Indet. annulated orthocone. C. Indet. smooth orthocerid?
Lesueurilla	L. prima	A gastropod of the family Lesueurillidae.	A-C. Thoralispira laevis. D-G. Carcassonnella vizcainoi A-E,G, I.Redonia michelae. F,H. Babinka prima A. Bathmoceras? sp. B. Indet. annulated orthocone. C. Indet. smooth orthocerid?
Lesueurilla	L. sp.	A gastropod of the family Lesueurillidae.	A-C. Thoralispira laevis. D-G. Carcassonnella vizcainoi A-E,G, I.Redonia michelae. F,H. Babinka prima A. Bathmoceras? sp. B. Indet. annulated orthocone. C. Indet. smooth orthocerid?
Redonia	R. michelae	A bivalve.	A-C. Thoralispira laevis. D-G. Carcassonnella vizcainoi A-E,G, I.Redonia michelae. F,H. Babinka prima A. Bathmoceras? sp. B. Indet. annulated orthocone. C. Indet. smooth orthocerid?
Ribeiria	R. personata	A rostroconch. It was mistaken for phyllocarid valves.	A-C. Thoralispira laevis. D-G. Carcassonnella vizcainoi A-E,G, I.Redonia michelae. F,H. Babinka prima A. Bathmoceras? sp. B. Indet. annulated orthocone. C. Indet. smooth orthocerid?
Smooth orthocerid?	Indet.	A cephalopod.	A-C. Thoralispira laevis. D-G. Carcassonnella vizcainoi A-E,G, I.Redonia michelae. F,H. Babinka prima A. Bathmoceras? sp. B. Indet. annulated orthocone. C. Indet. smooth orthocerid?
Tolmachovia	T. landeyranensis	A rostroconch.	A-C. Thoralispira laevis. D-G. Carcassonnella vizcainoi A-E,G, I.Redonia michelae. F,H. Babinka prima A. Bathmoceras? sp. B. Indet. annulated orthocone. C. Indet. smooth orthocerid?
Tolmachovia	T. sp. nov.	A rostroconch.	A-C. Thoralispira laevis. D-G. Carcassonnella vizcainoi A-E,G, I.Redonia michelae. F,H. Babinka prima A. Bathmoceras? sp. B. Indet. annulated orthocone. C. Indet. smooth orthocerid?
Thoralia	T. languedociana	A bivalve.	A-C. Thoralispira laevis. D-G. Carcassonnella vizcainoi A-E,G, I.Redonia michelae. F,H. Babinka prima A. Bathmoceras? sp. B. Indet. annulated orthocone. C. Indet. smooth orthocerid?
Thoralispira	T. laevis	A tergomyan.	A-C. Thoralispira laevis. D-G. Carcassonnella vizcainoi A-E,G, I.Redonia michelae. F,H. Babinka prima A. Bathmoceras? sp. B. Indet. annulated orthocone. C. Indet. smooth orthocerid?

=== Brachiopods ===
The Cabrières Lagerstätte has a yielded a relatively low-diversity brachiopod assemblage. The linguliform brachiopods are represented by the following genera: the broad an spatuliform pseudolingulid Sedlecilingula, and the more elongated obolids Rafanoglossa and Lingulella. The rhynchonelliformean brachiopods are represented by the following genera: the orthoids Hesperonomia, Ocorthis, Paralenorthis, Nothorthis and Prantlina and the plectorthoid Nanorthis. Based on a census of 149 shells, the brachiopod assemblage is dominated by Prantlina (38%). Each of the other genera represents less than 15%. In a similar way as the echinoderms of the Cabrières Biota, these brachiopods are notably small. The size reduction in marine invertebrates is often associated with stressful conditions (low oxygenation, oligotrophy, predation, physical disturbances). In the case of the Cabrières Biota, all of these parameters seem to have been limited, except the low oxygen condition, which is the most likely cause for size reduction in benthic invertebrates of the Cabrières Biota. Many valves are disarticulated and often cracked, but not broken; this taphonomic phenomenon was already observed in other brachiopod assemblages and may have been caused by a particular, possibly post-mortem, mass transport and sediment deposition and compaction. This agrees with the sedimentological data, suggesting punctual turbidity currents.

Genus	Species	Notes	Image
Conotreta	C. turricula		
Hesperonomia	H. landeyranensis		
Lingulella	L. sp.		
Nanorthis	N. sp.		
Nothorthis	N. sp.		
Ocorthis	O. occitanensis		
Orthambonites?	O.? roquebrunensis		
Paralenorthis	P. cf. robustus		
Paurorthis	P. tadridensis		
Prantlina	P. desiderata		
Progonambonites	P. sp.		
Rafanoglossa	R. sp.		
Ranorthis	R. sulcata		
Sedlecilingula	S. sp.		
Sinorthis	S. typica		
Spondyglossella	S. spondylifera		

=== Arthropods ===
The arthropod assemblage of the Cabrières Biota is mainly composed of trilobites alongside a new aglaspidid taxon, a chasmataspidid species and arthropod appendages of uncertain affinities.

Trilobites of the Cabrières Lagerstätte are mostly preserved as molds: no appendages, antennae or internal soft-parts have been identified. The assemblage is dominated by asaphids such as Asaphellus and Merlinia, raphiophorids such as Ampyx and other types of trilobites such as Colpocoryphe, Taihungshania, Geragnostus and others. Trilobite moults belonging to Asaphida have also been discovered; however, a more precise identification is impossible due to the poor preservation. The composition of the trilobite assemblages of the lower Ordovician of the Montagne Noire suggest a trend from distal shelf environments in the Saint-Chinian Formation to more proximal environments in the Foulon and Cluse de L'Orb Formations before returning to more distal conditions in the Landeyran Formation. The non-trilobite arthropods are rare in the Cabrières Biota compared to the Fezouata Formation where taxa such as hurdiid radiodonts, aglaspidids, marrellomorphs, early chelicerates and various others are a major component of the Fezouata Biota. Non-trilobite arthropods of the Cabrières Biota include a chelicerate species possibly belonging to Chasmataspidida, an aglaspidid sharing similarities with members of the family Tremaglaspididae and fragments of spiny appendages possibly belonging to chelicerates or radiodonts. Valves assigned to a new taxon of phyllocarid arthropods by Saleh et al. in 2024 were reinterpreted as shells of the mollusc Ribeiria. The presence of an aglaspidid in the polar Cabrières Biota alongside the other early Ordovician aglaspidid records in southern paleolatitudes (Morocco and Wales) compared the distribution of Cambrian aglaspidid in lower paleolatitudes may suggest that aglaspidids migrated in cooler waters due the high temperatures of the early Ordovician and/or that they mooved to higher paleolatitudes due to increased predation in lower paleolatitudes during this epoch.

Genus	Species	Notes	Image
Aglaspidida	nov.	A new aglaspidid that shares similarities with the members of the family Tremaglaspididae. It is one of the rare non-trilobite arthropods of the Cabrières Biota.	
Ampyx	A. priscus	A trilobite belonging to the family Raphiophoridae.	A. Colpocoryphe thorali. B. Parabathycheilus sp. C. Ampyx sp. D. E. Taihungshania sp. F. Apatokephalus sp. G. Geragnostus boutouryensis. H. Merlinia? sp. I. Asaphellus sp. J. wrinkled pygidium of Asaphidae. Scale bars: 5 mm.
Apatokephalus	A. incisus	A trilobite.	A. Colpocoryphe thorali. B. Parabathycheilus sp. C. Ampyx sp. D. E. Taihungshania sp. F. Apatokephalus sp. G. Geragnostus boutouryensis. H. Merlinia? sp. I. Asaphellus sp. J. wrinkled pygidium of Asaphidae. Scale bars: 5 mm.
Asaphellus	A. sp.	A trilobite belonging to the family Asaphidae.	A. Colpocoryphe thorali. B. Parabathycheilus sp. C. Ampyx sp. D. E. Taihungshania sp. F. Apatokephalus sp. G. Geragnostus boutouryensis. H. Merlinia? sp. I. Asaphellus sp. J. wrinkled pygidium of Asaphidae. Scale bars: 5 mm.
Asaphida	indet.		A. Colpocoryphe thorali. B. Parabathycheilus sp. C. Ampyx sp. D. E. Taihungshania sp. F. Apatokephalus sp. G. Geragnostus boutouryensis. H. Merlinia? sp. I. Asaphellus sp. J. wrinkled pygidium of Asaphidae. Scale bars: 5 mm.
Basiliella	B. mediterranea	A trilobite belonging to the family Asaphidae.	A. Colpocoryphe thorali. B. Parabathycheilus sp. C. Ampyx sp. D. E. Taihungshania sp. F. Apatokephalus sp. G. Geragnostus boutouryensis. H. Merlinia? sp. I. Asaphellus sp. J. wrinkled pygidium of Asaphidae. Scale bars: 5 mm.
Carolinites	C. vizcainoi	A trilobite belonging to the family Telephinidae, sometimes considered a member of the family Cyclopygidae.	A. Colpocoryphe thorali. B. Parabathycheilus sp. C. Ampyx sp. D. E. Taihungshania sp. F. Apatokephalus sp. G. Geragnostus boutouryensis. H. Merlinia? sp. I. Asaphellus sp. J. wrinkled pygidium of Asaphidae. Scale bars: 5 mm.
Chasmataspidida	indet.	A chelicerate, one of the rare non-trilobite arthropods of the Cabrières Biota.	A. Colpocoryphe thorali. B. Parabathycheilus sp. C. Ampyx sp. D. E. Taihungshania sp. F. Apatokephalus sp. G. Geragnostus boutouryensis. H. Merlinia? sp. I. Asaphellus sp. J. wrinkled pygidium of Asaphidae. Scale bars: 5 mm.
Colpocoryphe	C. sp.	A trilobite belonging to the family Calymenidae.	A. Colpocoryphe thorali. B. Parabathycheilus sp. C. Ampyx sp. D. E. Taihungshania sp. F. Apatokephalus sp. G. Geragnostus boutouryensis. H. Merlinia? sp. I. Asaphellus sp. J. wrinkled pygidium of Asaphidae. Scale bars: 5 mm.
Colpocoryphe	C. deani	A trilobite belonging to the family Calymenidae.	A. Colpocoryphe thorali. B. Parabathycheilus sp. C. Ampyx sp. D. E. Taihungshania sp. F. Apatokephalus sp. G. Geragnostus boutouryensis. H. Merlinia? sp. I. Asaphellus sp. J. wrinkled pygidium of Asaphidae. Scale bars: 5 mm.
Colpocoryphe	C. thorali	A trilobite belonging to the family Calymenidae.	A. Colpocoryphe thorali. B. Parabathycheilus sp. C. Ampyx sp. D. E. Taihungshania sp. F. Apatokephalus sp. G. Geragnostus boutouryensis. H. Merlinia? sp. I. Asaphellus sp. J. wrinkled pygidium of Asaphidae. Scale bars: 5 mm.
Euloma	E. ultima	A trilobite belonging to the family Eulomidae.	A. Colpocoryphe thorali. B. Parabathycheilus sp. C. Ampyx sp. D. E. Taihungshania sp. F. Apatokephalus sp. G. Geragnostus boutouryensis. H. Merlinia? sp. I. Asaphellus sp. J. wrinkled pygidium of Asaphidae. Scale bars: 5 mm.
Foulonia	F. peregrina	A trilobite belonging to the family Cheiruridae.	A. Colpocoryphe thorali. B. Parabathycheilus sp. C. Ampyx sp. D. E. Taihungshania sp. F. Apatokephalus sp. G. Geragnostus boutouryensis. H. Merlinia? sp. I. Asaphellus sp. J. wrinkled pygidium of Asaphidae. Scale bars: 5 mm.
Geragnostus	G. sp.	An agnostid belonging to the family Metagnostidae.	A. Colpocoryphe thorali. B. Parabathycheilus sp. C. Ampyx sp. D. E. Taihungshania sp. F. Apatokephalus sp. G. Geragnostus boutouryensis. H. Merlinia? sp. I. Asaphellus sp. J. wrinkled pygidium of Asaphidae. Scale bars: 5 mm.
Geragnostus	G. mediterraneus	An agnostid belonging to the family Metagnostidae.	A. Colpocoryphe thorali. B. Parabathycheilus sp. C. Ampyx sp. D. E. Taihungshania sp. F. Apatokephalus sp. G. Geragnostus boutouryensis. H. Merlinia? sp. I. Asaphellus sp. J. wrinkled pygidium of Asaphidae. Scale bars: 5 mm.
Geragnostus	G. occitanus	An agnostid belonging to the family Metagnostidae.	A. Colpocoryphe thorali. B. Parabathycheilus sp. C. Ampyx sp. D. E. Taihungshania sp. F. Apatokephalus sp. G. Geragnostus boutouryensis. H. Merlinia? sp. I. Asaphellus sp. J. wrinkled pygidium of Asaphidae. Scale bars: 5 mm.
Hoekaspis?	H? quadrata	A trilobite belonging to the family Asaphidae.	A. Colpocoryphe thorali. B. Parabathycheilus sp. C. Ampyx sp. D. E. Taihungshania sp. F. Apatokephalus sp. G. Geragnostus boutouryensis. H. Merlinia? sp. I. Asaphellus sp. J. wrinkled pygidium of Asaphidae. Scale bars: 5 mm.
Incisopyge?	I? theroni	A trilobite belonging to the family Cyclopygidae.	A. Colpocoryphe thorali. B. Parabathycheilus sp. C. Ampyx sp. D. E. Taihungshania sp. F. Apatokephalus sp. G. Geragnostus boutouryensis. H. Merlinia? sp. I. Asaphellus sp. J. wrinkled pygidium of Asaphidae. Scale bars: 5 mm.
Megistaspis	M. (Ekeraspis) roquebrunensis	A trilobite belonging to the family Asaphidae.	A. Colpocoryphe thorali. B. Parabathycheilus sp. C. Ampyx sp. D. E. Taihungshania sp. F. Apatokephalus sp. G. Geragnostus boutouryensis. H. Merlinia? sp. I. Asaphellus sp. J. wrinkled pygidium of Asaphidae. Scale bars: 5 mm.
Merlinia	M. sp.	A trilobite belonging to the family Asaphidae.	A. Colpocoryphe thorali. B. Parabathycheilus sp. C. Ampyx sp. D. E. Taihungshania sp. F. Apatokephalus sp. G. Geragnostus boutouryensis. H. Merlinia? sp. I. Asaphellus sp. J. wrinkled pygidium of Asaphidae. Scale bars: 5 mm.
Neseuretus	N. sp.	A trilobite belonging to the family Calymenidae.	A. Colpocoryphe thorali. B. Parabathycheilus sp. C. Ampyx sp. D. E. Taihungshania sp. F. Apatokephalus sp. G. Geragnostus boutouryensis. H. Merlinia? sp. I. Asaphellus sp. J. wrinkled pygidium of Asaphidae. Scale bars: 5 mm.
Niobella	N. fourneti	A trilobite belonging to the family Asaphidae.	A. Colpocoryphe thorali. B. Parabathycheilus sp. C. Ampyx sp. D. E. Taihungshania sp. F. Apatokephalus sp. G. Geragnostus boutouryensis. H. Merlinia? sp. I. Asaphellus sp. J. wrinkled pygidium of Asaphidae. Scale bars: 5 mm.
Niobella	N. cf. lignieresi	A trilobite belonging to the family Asaphidae.	A. Colpocoryphe thorali. B. Parabathycheilus sp. C. Ampyx sp. D. E. Taihungshania sp. F. Apatokephalus sp. G. Geragnostus boutouryensis. H. Merlinia? sp. I. Asaphellus sp. J. wrinkled pygidium of Asaphidae. Scale bars: 5 mm.
Parabathycheilus	P. gallicus	A trilobite belonging to the family Bathycheilidae. It is also known as Bathycheilus gallicus.	A. Colpocoryphe thorali. B. Parabathycheilus sp. C. Ampyx sp. D. E. Taihungshania sp. F. Apatokephalus sp. G. Geragnostus boutouryensis. H. Merlinia? sp. I. Asaphellus sp. J. wrinkled pygidium of Asaphidae. Scale bars: 5 mm.
Platycalymene	P. (Pharostomina) nazairensis	A trilobite belonging to the family Calymenidae.	A. Colpocoryphe thorali. B. Parabathycheilus sp. C. Ampyx sp. D. E. Taihungshania sp. F. Apatokephalus sp. G. Geragnostus boutouryensis. H. Merlinia? sp. I. Asaphellus sp. J. wrinkled pygidium of Asaphidae. Scale bars: 5 mm.
Pliomerops	P. escoti	A trilobite belonging to the family Pliomeridae.	A. Colpocoryphe thorali. B. Parabathycheilus sp. C. Ampyx sp. D. E. Taihungshania sp. F. Apatokephalus sp. G. Geragnostus boutouryensis. H. Merlinia? sp. I. Asaphellus sp. J. wrinkled pygidium of Asaphidae. Scale bars: 5 mm.
Prionocheilus	P. matutinus	A trilobite belonging to the family Pharostomatidae.	A. Colpocoryphe thorali. B. Parabathycheilus sp. C. Ampyx sp. D. E. Taihungshania sp. F. Apatokephalus sp. G. Geragnostus boutouryensis. H. Merlinia? sp. I. Asaphellus sp. J. wrinkled pygidium of Asaphidae. Scale bars: 5 mm.
Proetidella?	P.? sp.	A trilobite belonging to the order Proetida.	A. Colpocoryphe thorali. B. Parabathycheilus sp. C. Ampyx sp. D. E. Taihungshania sp. F. Apatokephalus sp. G. Geragnostus boutouryensis. H. Merlinia? sp. I. Asaphellus sp. J. wrinkled pygidium of Asaphidae. Scale bars: 5 mm.
Selenopeltis	S. binodosus	A trilobite belonging to the family Odontopleuridae.	A. Colpocoryphe thorali. B. Parabathycheilus sp. C. Ampyx sp. D. E. Taihungshania sp. F. Apatokephalus sp. G. Geragnostus boutouryensis. H. Merlinia? sp. I. Asaphellus sp. J. wrinkled pygidium of Asaphidae. Scale bars: 5 mm.
Taihungshania	T. sp.	A trilobite belonging to the family Taihungshaniidae.	A. Colpocoryphe thorali. B. Parabathycheilus sp. C. Ampyx sp. D. E. Taihungshania sp. F. Apatokephalus sp. G. Geragnostus boutouryensis. H. Merlinia? sp. I. Asaphellus sp. J. wrinkled pygidium of Asaphidae. Scale bars: 5 mm.
Toletanaspis	T. courtessolei	A trilobite belonging to the family Dalmanitidae.	A. Colpocoryphe thorali. B. Parabathycheilus sp. C. Ampyx sp. D. E. Taihungshania sp. F. Apatokephalus sp. G. Geragnostus boutouryensis. H. Merlinia? sp. I. Asaphellus sp. J. wrinkled pygidium of Asaphidae. Scale bars: 5 mm.

=== Vermiform organisms ===
Several, mostly incomplete specimens of vermiform organisms have been discovered in the Cabrières Biota. Two forms of palaeoscolecids have been identified, they are annulated worms covered by a regular pattern of small cuticular plates or tubercles. The two forms differ from each other in the shape and arrangement of the ornamentation. Other narrow cylindrical body fossils possibly represent scalidophorans. Although some of them appear as simple cylindrical shapes, some fossils are more detailed and display minute, possibly spinose, tubercles. The anterior region of one specimen could represent the introvert (head that can be retracted into the trunk in scalidophoran worms). Other distinct vermiform fossils are attributed to the major clade Lophotrochozoa (mainly composed of molluscs, annelids and lophophorates), with possible affinites to annelids. Some specimens display ridges that might represent sclerites. Moreover, the body bears two rows of inderminate metameric structures, further supporting a possible affinity with annelids. The lophotrochozoan worm form was therefore hypothetically reconstructed as a cylindrical, possibly ventrally flattened animal with a metameric organization, parapodia-like appendages and covered by dorsal sclerites. One specimen occurs within a possible locomotion trace, indicating an epibenthic animal moving on the sediments whereas scalidophorans were probably burrowers playing an important role in bioturbation. A possible armoured lobopodian has been recovered from the Cabrières Biota. Machaeridian material attributed to cf. Plumulites have also been discovered in the lower Landeyran Formation.

Genus	Species	Notes	Image
Lobopodia?	indet.	A possible armoured lobopodian.	150x150
Lophotrochozoa?	indet.		
cf. Plumulites		A member of Machaeridia.	
Palaeoscolecida	indet. 1		
Palaeoscolecida	indet. 2		
Scalidophora?	indet.		

Ichnofossils

The following table lists the ichnotaxa of the entire Landeyran Formation in order to provide a broader context.

The Landeyran River site covers the upper Foulon Formation and the lower Landeyran Fomation (Apatokephalus incisus Biozone). The Lagerstätte site also represents the Apatokephalus incisus Biozone, the beds of both sites are equivalent. They correspond to the Cabrières Biota. The Abandoned Vineyard site represents the Hangchungolithus primitivus Biozone, upper Landeyran Formation. The Road Cut site also belongs to the Hangchungolithus primitivus Biozone.

The ichnofossil diversity of the Landeyran Formation is moderate, with at least eight ichnospecies having been identified. They are divided in five categories: simple horizontal trails, represented by Helminthoidichnites tenuis and Helminthopsis granulata, passively filled horizontal burrows, represented by Palaeophycus tubularis, simple actively filled horizontal to oblique structures, represented by Planolites montanus and ?Torrowangea isp., simple actively filled (with pellets) horizontal burrows represented by Alcyonidiopsis longobardiae and vertical unbranched burrows, represented by Skolithos linearis. Faecal pellets belonging to Coprulus oblongus have also been recovered. The distribution of the ichnotaxa shows a transition from simple open vertical burrows (Skolithos) and simple open subhorizontal burrows (Palaeophycus) made by suspension feeders and passive predators in the uppermost Foulon Formation and lowermost Landeyran Formation to simple horizontal trails (Helminthoidichnites and Helminthopsis) made by semi-infaunal grazers and finally sub-surface burrows (Alcyonidiopsis and Planolites) and faecal pellets (Coprulus) made by deposit feeders in the Landeyran Formation.

The offshore and shelf deposits of the Landeyran Formation display little to no bioturbation, suggesting dysoxic conditions in the sediments. These conditions likely resulted in the proliferation of microbes within the sediment.

Ichnogenus	Ichnospecies	Notes	Image
Alcyonidiopsis	A. longobardiae	A burrow filled with small faecal pellets. The ichnotaxon is abundant within the Landeyan River section, but was also noted in the Road Cut and Lagerstätte sites.	
Coprulus	C. oblungus	Isolated faecal pellets.	
Helminthoidichnites	H. tenuis	A simple horizontal trail. The ichnotaxon was found at the Landeyan River, the Abandoned Vineyard, and the Road Cut sites.	
Helminthopsis	H. granulata	A simple horizontal trail. The ichnotaxon was found at the Landeyan River and Lagerstätte sites.	
Palaeophycus	P. tubularis	A simple subhorizontal burrow. The ichnotaxon is found at the Landeyran River site.	
Planolites	P. montanus	A simple subhorizontal burrow. The ichnotaxon was found at the Landeyan River, the Abandoned Vineyard, the Lagerstätte, and the Road Cut sites.	
Skolithos	S. linearis	A simple vertical burrow. The ichnotaxon was found at the Landeyan River site	
Torrowangea?	T.? isp.	A simple horizontal burrow with potential constrictions. Only one specimen, from the Abandoned Vineyard site, is known.	

== See also ==
- Beecher's Trilobite Type Preservation – the term for sites where soft tissues are replaced with pyrite.
