= Lens (geology) =

Body of ore or rock that is thick in the middle and thin at the edges

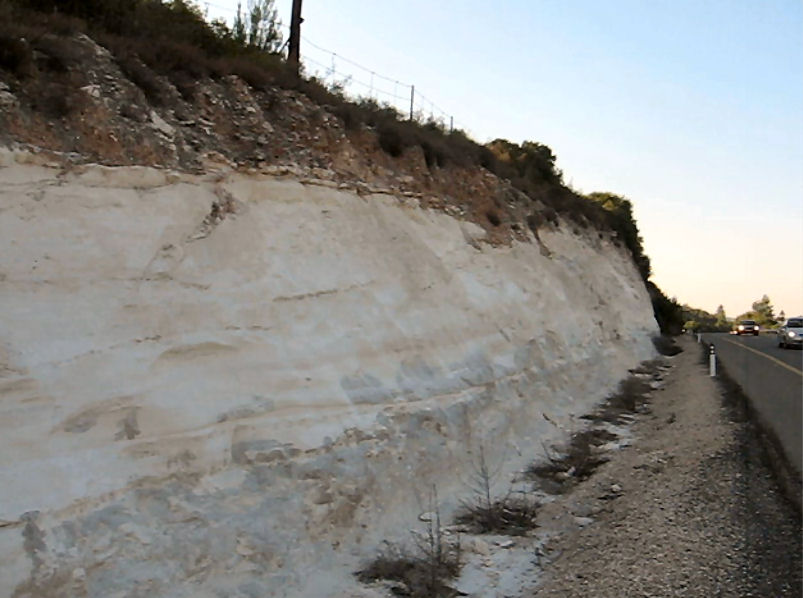
Lens shown next to a road.

In geology, a lens or lentil is a body of ore or rock that is thick in the middle and thin at the edges, resembling a convex lens in cross-section.

To thin out in all directions is to "lens out", also known as "lensing". The adjectives "lenticular" and "lentiform" are used to describe lens-like formations. Lenticle is a synonym for lentil, but may also refer to a fragment of rock that is lens-shaped. "Lenticule" is used for small lentil.

A lentil may also refer a minor unit in a formation of rock, similar to a member but not generally spread out over a large geographical area. In this usage, the lentil thins out towards its edges.

Lenticular bedding is a special form of rock interbedded mudrock and cross-laminated rippled sandstone. The lenses or ripples in lenticular beds are discontinuous in all directions.

== See also ==
- Flaser bed – Sedimentary bedding pattern
