= Heterolithic bedding =

Sedimentary structure made up of interbedded deposits of sand and mud

Heterolithic bedding is a sedimentary structure made up of interbedded deposits of sand and mud. It is formed mainly in tidal flats but can also be formed in glacial environments. Examples from fluvial environments have been documented but are rare. Heterolithic bedding forms in response to alternations in sediment supply and tidal velocity. The fluctuations result in the interbedded layers of sand and mud. The rippled sand layer is formed during high tidal currents, while the mud is deposited during slack tide periods.

== Heterolithic bedding types ==
The three main types of heterolithic bedding are flaser, wavy, and lenticular. Starved ripples and cross bedding with flasers can also be considered forms of heterolithic bedding. Differentiating of these various types of heterolithic bedding is based on the relative volume of mud and sand. This key determining factor is controlled by the timing, and duration of both the high tide, and slack tide depositional periods.

=== Flaser bed ===
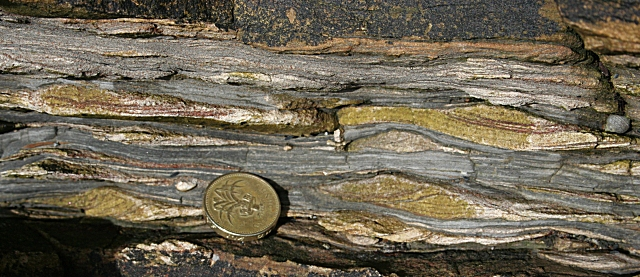
Flaser bedding, vertical cross section.

If the amount of deposited sand exceeds mud deposits, we get ripples with isolated mud drapes in ripple troughs and crests. This type of sedimentary structure is called flaser bedding. Flaser bedding can be subdivided according to how the mud is deposited over the rippled sand. The various types of flaser bedding are simple flaser, bifurcated flaser, wavy flaser, and bifurcated wavy flaser. Simple flaser bedding is when the flasers do not contact one another and they are concave when the bed is upright. Mud in simple flaser deposits is limited to ripple troughs. Bifurcated flaser bedding occurs when a second flaser is deposited over a pre-existing flaser. The bifurcated flasers resemble a sideways “y” shape. Wavy flaser bedding occurs when a flaser drapes both the ripple trough and crest but forms no continuous layer.

=== Wavy bedding ===
If mud and sand deposits are equal, wavy bedding is produced. Wavy bedding occurs when mud is deposited over the whole area of a bed of rippled and/or cross stratified sand. It usually loosely follows the alternating concave-convex nature of the ripples creating a wavy appearance. In wavy bedding the ripples are laterally discontinuous. Wavy bedding marks the boundary between flaser and lenticular bedding.

=== Lenticular bedding ===
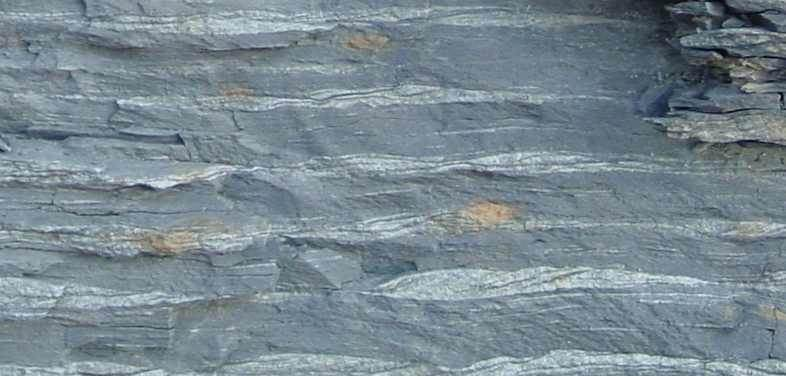
Lenticular bedding formation from the Pennsylvanian of Kentucky. Shows the characteristic large quantities of mud covering 'lens-like' sand.

Lenticular bedding occurs when sand ripples are deposited in mud in an isolated distribution pattern. Ripples in lenticular bedding are both laterally and horizontally discontinuous. Lenticular bedding can be subdivided according to whether or not they have connected lenses and the type of lenses they feature. Lenticular bedding with connected lenses can have up to 75% of discontinuous lenses. Lenticular bedding with single lenses has to have more than 75% discontinuous lenses. Lens thickness is based on a length to height ratio. Thick lenses have a length/height ratio that is < 20 and flat lens ratio is > 20. So the possible types of lenticular bedding are lenticular bedding with connected flat or thick lenses and lenticular bedding with single flat or thick lenses.
