= Machaeridia =

Machaeridia may refer to:

- Machaeridia (annelid), a class of prehistoric worms
- Machaeridia (insect), a genus of insects in the family Acrididae
