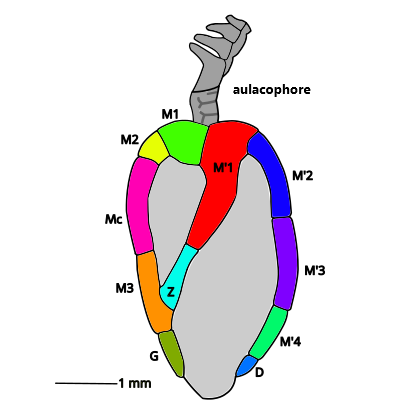
- Diagrammatic reconstruction of the lower thecal surface of Nanocarpus dolambii. M=marginal plate. Z=zygal plate. G=glossal plate. D=digital plate.

Scientific classification
- Kingdom: Animalia
- Phylum: Echinodermata
- Class: †Stylophora
- Order: †Cornuta
- Family: †Amygdalothecidae
- Genus: †Nanocarpus; Ubaghs 1991

Type species
- †N. dolambii Ubaghs, 1991

Other species
- †"N." guoleensis Chen & Han, 2013

= Nanocarpus =

Nanocarpus Temporal range: Tremadocian–Floian Furongian record if "N." guoleensis is included

Extinct genus of echinoderms

Nanocarpus is an extinct genus of exceptionally small stylophoran echinoderms belonging to the possibly paraphyletic group Cornuta. The type species, N. dolambii, is known from the late Floian of the Montagne Noire (France) and possibly in the Tremadocian of Morocco. Another species, "N." guoleensis, was previously attributed to the genus. It was discovered in the late Cambrian (Furongian) of Guangxi (China). However, this species is not a member of the genus Nanocarpus and is currently regarded as an early mitrate.

== History and species ==
The type species, N. dolambii, was named by Ubaghs in 1991. It was discovered in the Landeyran river valley in the Hérault department, in the southern part of the Montagne Noire, southern France. This species was also recovered from the Cabrières Lagerstätte. These sites belong to the lower part of the Landeyran Formation, a late Floian (early Ordovician) unit principally composed of mudstone. Material assigned to N. cf. dolambii was discovered in the late Tremadocian of the Anti-Atlas (Morocco).

"N." guoleensis was named by Chen & Han in 2013. It was discovered in the Jingxi County, Guangxi, southern China. The species was recovered from the same strata as the cornute "Phyllocystis" jingxiensis, it belongs to the Furongian (late Cambrian) Guole Formation. However, the validity of the Guole Formation is doubted by some authors; therefore, these strata are classified within the Sandu Formation. A reexamination of the material of "N". guoleensis indicates that this species is not an amygdalothecid cornute but an early mitrate.

Another cornute species, Juliaecarpus milnerorum, which was originally referred to the Katian Upper Ktaoua Formation in Anti-Atlas by Ruta in 1999, was recombined as Nanocarpus milnerorum by Lefebvre in 2001. The locality where Juliaecarpus was discovered was reattributed to the Katian Lower Second Bani Formation. Lefebvre et al. described new material from the same locality as the holotype and from the Katian Upper Tiouririne Formation in 2022, other specimens resembling N. milnerorum were discovered in other Ordovician horizons of Morocco. They concluded that this species was more similar to the amygdalothecid genus Domfrontia, and therefore created the combination Domfrontia milnerorum.

== Description ==
Nanocarpus dolambii is an extremely small species of cornutes, the theca is smaller than 1 cm long. It is elongate, ovoid or sub-quadrangular and slightly asymmetrical.

As in most stylophorans, the theca is composed of an integumentary area framed by skeletal elements: the marginal plates. N. dolambii shows ten marginal plates (including the glossal plate and the digital plate). The anterior outline of the frame (marginal plates 1 and 2) is concave where the aulacophore (flexible feeding appendage) is inserted in the theca. The lateral margins converge gently toward the back of the theca, but terminate without meeting, leaving the marginal frame open posteriorly. On the lower face of the theca, the marginal plate 1 extends toward the center of the theca to connect with the zygal plate, the only skeletal plate fully enclosed in the theca. The zygal plate is linked to the marginal plate 3. Together, the zygal and the marginal plate 1 form a bar that goes all the way across the integumentary surface of the lower thecal surface and connects the left and right sides of the frame. The aulacophore is framed by the marginal plates 1 and 2 on the lower thecal surface and by two smaller delicate plates on the upper thecal surface: the adoral plates.

The aulacophore is quite small, being shorter than half of the theca. The proximal part of the aulacophore is composed of three or four rings. The median element that occupies an important part of the aulacophore, the stylocone, bears a robust spine that is more or less curved toward the theca. The distal aulacophore is composed of three to four elements that decrease in size toward the last one. These elements also bear strong spines on their lower surfaces. The distal part also bears several cover plates.

"Nanocarpus" guoleensis is overall similar to N. dolambii: a small (less than a centimeter), posteriorly open, tapering toward the back theca framed by ten broad marginal plates, a central zygal plate and strong spines on the lower surface of the ossicles. These characteristics supported the indentification of this species as a member of the genus Nanocarpus. However, subsequent authors noted that the two adoral plates are extremely large and that the ossicles are well articulated, allowing the aulacophore to be preserved in a recurved position, which is typical of mitrates. Therefore, "N." guoleensis is considered as an early mitrate.
