= Eulomina =

Scientific classification
- Domain: Eukaryota
- Kingdom: Animalia
- Phylum: Arthropoda
- Class: †Trilobita
- Order: †Phacopida
- Family: †Bathycheilidae
- Genus: †Eulomina; Ruzicka, 1931

Genus of trilobites

Eulomina a genus of trilobites in the order Phacopida, that existed during the lower Ordovician in what is now the Czech Republic. It was described by Ruzicka in 1931, and the type species is Eulomina mitratum, which the author originally described under the genus Euloma in 1926. The type locality was the Trenice Formation.
