= Lepidocoleus =

Lepidocoleus Temporal range: Late Ordovician–Late Devonian

Scientific classification
- Kingdom: Animalia
- Phylum: Annelida
- Clade: Pleistoannelida
- Subclass: Errantia
- Order: Phyllodocida
- Family: †Lepidocoleidae
- Genus: †Lepidocoleus; Faber, 1886

Species
- †Lepidocoleus caliburnus; †Lepidocoleus shurikenus

Extinct genus of annelids

Lepidocoleus is a genus of extinct armored annelid worm in the class Machaeridia. Two notable species are L. caliburnus or the "Excalibur worm", and L. shurikenus, or the "shuriken worm". The creature had a "suit" of armor running down its body in the form of overlapping calcite crystals. This worm probably lived in shallow water reefs feeding on organic waste. It lived from the Hirnantian of the upper Ordovician to the Famennian of the Devonian.

== Description ==
The worm is tiny, only about a fraction of an inch long. The creatures had two pairs of armor plates on their body, one running the length of the skeleton, and the other on the sides of the body. Because of this, the worm probably could have rolled into a ball like a Trilobite.
