= Bathycheilidae =

Scientific classification
- Kingdom: Animalia
- Phylum: Arthropoda
- Clade: †Artiopoda
- Class: †Trilobita
- Order: †Phacopida
- Suborder: †Calymenina
- Family: †Bathycheilidae; Pribyl, 1953

Bathycheilidae is a family of trilobites comprising the genera Bathycheilus, Calymenia and Eulomina.
