= Bathycheilus =

Scientific classification
- Domain: Eukaryota
- Kingdom: Animalia
- Phylum: Arthropoda
- Class: †Trilobita
- Order: †Phacopida
- Family: †Bathycheilidae
- Genus: †Bathycheilus; Holub, 1908

Genus of trilobites

Bathycheilus is a genus of trilobites in the order Phacopida. It was described by Holub in 1908.

== Species ==
- Bathycheilus castilianus Hammann, 1983
- Bathycheilus gallica Dean, 1965
- Bathycheilus galticus Dean, 1965
- Bathycheilus perplexus (Barrande, 1872)
- Bathycheilus sinensis Chen & Zhou, 2002
