= Ribeiria =

Ribeiria Temporal range: Mid Cambrian–Silurian

Scientific classification
- Kingdom: Animalia
- Phylum: Mollusca
- Class: †Rostroconchia
- Order: †Ribeirioida
- Genus: †Ribeiria; Sharpe, 1853

Species
- R. junior Runnegar, 1996

Extinct genus of molluscs

Ribeiria is a genus of rostroconch mollusc with a pegma, once interpreted as an intermediate between helcionellids (such as Anabarella and Latouchella) and primitive scaphopods (such as Pinnocaris).
