= Lepidocoleidae =

Scientific classification
- Domain: Eukaryota
- Kingdom: Animalia
- Phylum: Annelida
- Clade: Pleistoannelida
- Subclass: Errantia
- Order: Phyllodocida
- Clade: †Cuniculepadida
- Family: †Lepidocoleidae; Clarke, 1896

Family of polychaetes

Lepidocoleidae is a family of polychaetes belonging to the order Phyllodocida.

Lepidocoleidaes have an armor-like exoskeleton that consists of large enclosed mineralized calcite plates with two different crystalline layers with both rugae and growth lines on their external surface.

Genera:

- Carnicoleus Dzik, 1986
- Clarkeolepis Elias, 1958
- Compacoleus Schallreuter, 1985
- Kerrycoleus Prokop, 2002
- †Lepidocoleus Faber, 1886
- Sokolophocoleus Pope, 1960
- Turrilepas Woodward, 1865
