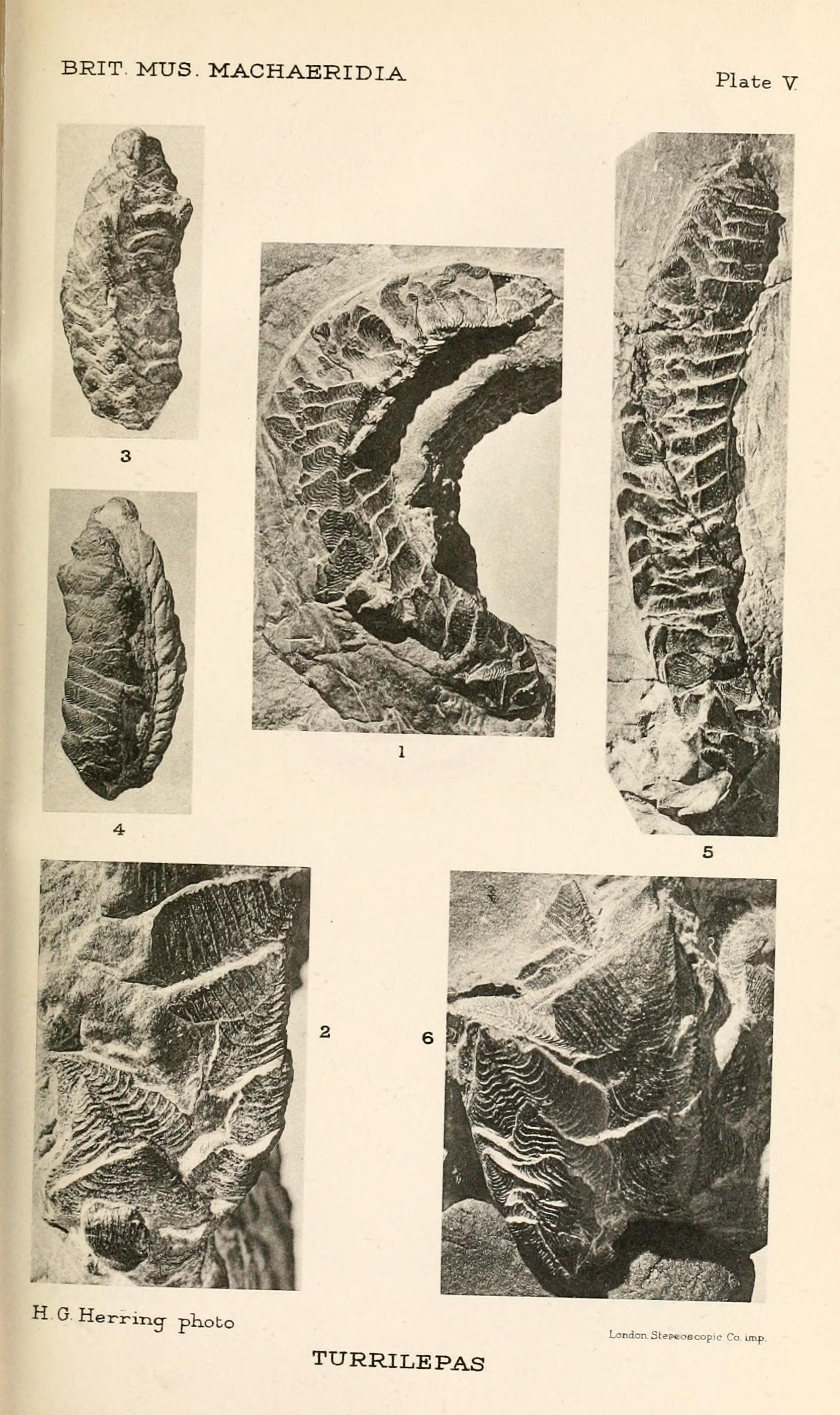
- Turrilepas specimens.

Scientific classification
- Domain: Eukaryota
- Kingdom: Animalia
- Phylum: Annelida
- Clade: Pleistoannelida
- Subclass: Errantia
- Order: Phyllodocida
- Suborder: Aphroditiformia
- Clade: †Machaeridia

Families
- †Plumulitidae; †Turrilepadidae; †Lepidocoleidae

= Machaeridia (annelid) =

Machaeridia Temporal range: Early Ordovician–Carboniferous

Extinct class of annelid worms

Machaeridia is an extinct group of armoured, segmented annelid worms, known from the Early Ordovician (Late Tremadoc) to Carboniferous. It consists of three distinct families: the plumulitids, turrilepadids and lepidocoleids.

== Fossils ==
Only the calcitic sclerites ("armour plates") of these worms tend to be preserved in the fossil record. These are tiny, and usually found disarticulated: articulated specimens reach about a centimeter in length, and are incredibly rare – hence the limited degree of study since their description in 1857.

The machaeridians are characterized by having serialized rows of calcitic shell plates. The dorsal sclerites were convex and almost isometric; lateral sclerites were flatter and longer. The plates comprised two calcite layers: the outer layer is thin and formed by lamellar deposition, whereas new elements were added to the thicker inner layer as it grew. Scales are ridged with growth lines, implying that they grew episodically. A few taxa experimented with different approaches to scale formation; some were only very weakly calcified and may have mainly been organic in nature. They were never moulted, and each scale could be moved with an attached muscle.

The front two segments of the machaeridians were commonly different from the rest, bearing fewer spiny projections.

The plumulitids are flattened from above and looks much like the coat of mail armour of chitons. The two other families are laterally compressed and some lepidocoleids formed a dorsal hinge, which make these machaeridians look like a string of bivalves.

== Ecology ==
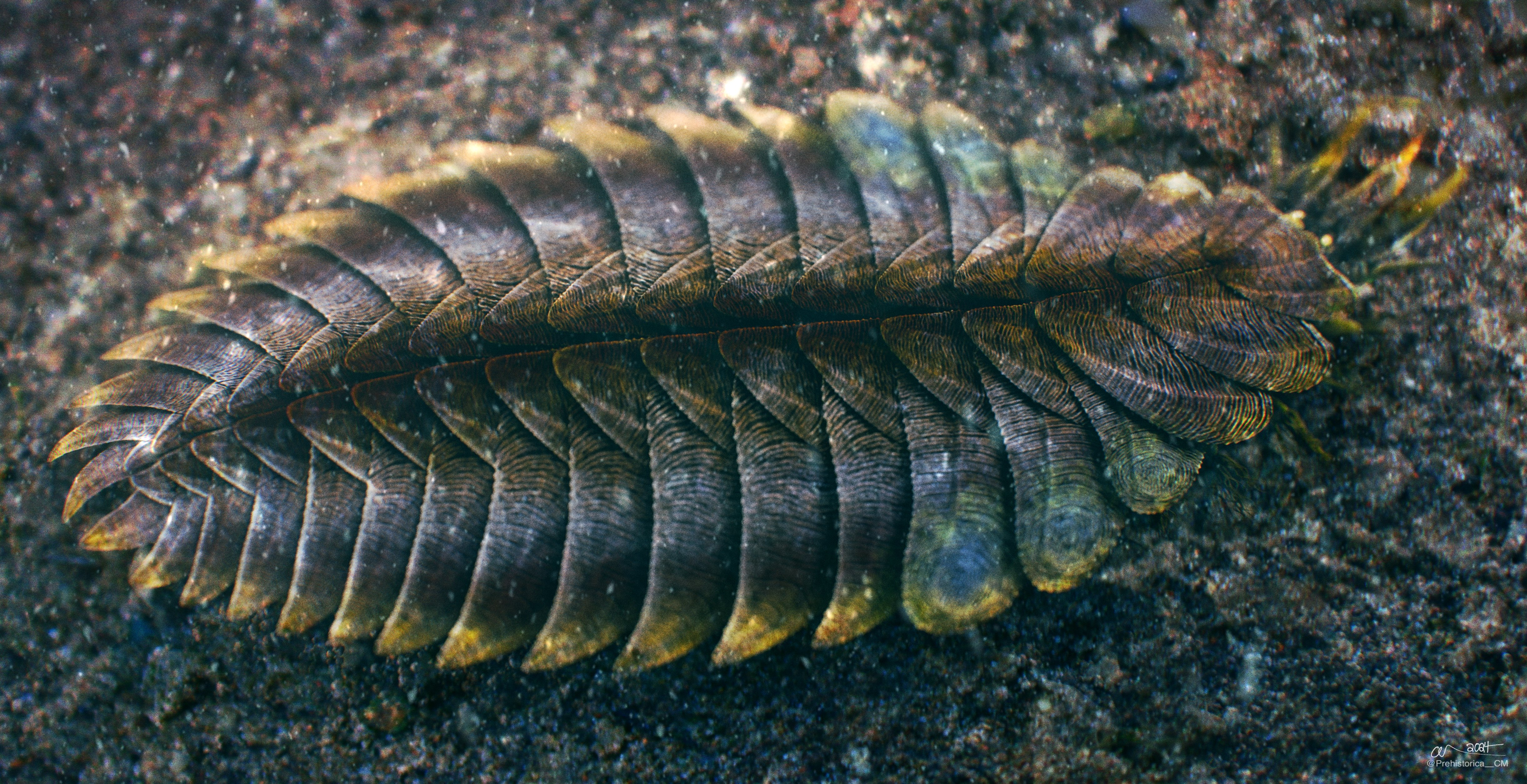
Plumulites bengstoni, a plumulitid from the Fezouata Shale of Morocco.

Machaeridians are often found in association with stylophorans - the cornutes and mitrates. This suggests that they possessed a similar ecology. They probably fed on organic detritus, perhaps even the faeces of the accompanying stylophorans.

Their scales almost certainly performed a defensive role.

The organisms would have had limited ability to flex to the right and left (in the sagittal plane), but would have been able to roll up. While most possessed bilateral symmetry, the scales on the right and left side of Turrilepas wrightiana are different in shape and form. The Plumulitid machaeridians would have moved across the surface of the sea floor using parapodia, whereas the fully armoured Turrelepids and Lepidocoelids burrowed in a peristaltic fashion reminiscent of their evolutionary cousins, the earthworms. This burrowing role has subjected them to the same evolutionary pressures which affect burrowing bivalves; convergent evolution as a result of their shared function probably contributed to early suggestions that the machaeridians should be classified with the molluscs.

== Taxonomic affinity ==
Historically the group has been assigned to the echinoderms, barnacles, annelids and mollusks. Relationships to other Cambrian forms (such as the Halkieriids) have been proposed and discounted. In 2008, the discovery of a fossil preserving soft tissue (including chaetae and parapodia) established an annelid affinity. Machaeridians represent the only instance of this group developing calcitic armour (notwithstanding certain polychaetes that integrate calcite into their chaetae). The exact position with annelids remains unresolved, though some characters indicate a relationship to Aphroditacean annelids (Vinther et al. 2008). In an accompanying commentary, Jean-Bernard Caron suggested that machaeridians must be a stem group based on number of specialised features. However, one cannot assess crown group/stem group affinities based on autapomorphies, but on shared morphological traits or the lack thereof. He also suggested that machaeridians might be polyphyletic, but machaerdians are a well defined group with a number of shared characters and morphological gradations among all three families.

A study in 2019 recognized machaeridians as phyllodocids based on their jaws.

== Articulated specimens ==
Articulated machaeridians are known from:

Taxon	Location	Date	Reference
Lepidocoleus sarlei (Lepidocoleidae)	Rochester Shale Lagerstätten, New York State	Wenlock, Silurian	
Lepidocoleus hohensteini (Lepidocoleidae) (with soft tissue)	Hunsrück Slate, Germany	Lower Emsian, Devonian	
Plumulites bengtsoni (Plumulitidae)	Fezouata Formation, Morocco	Lower Ordovician	
Turrilepas wrightiana (Turrilepidae)	Gotland, Sweden	Hemse, Silurian	
Lepidocoleus sp.	Bois d’Arc Formation, Cravat Member. Coal County, Oklahoma	Helderbergian, Lower Devonian	
Plumulites richorum (Plumulitidae)	Humevale Formation, Victoria, Australia	Lower Devonian	
Deltacoleus crassus (Turrelipidae)	Balclatchie Formation, Scotland	Upper Ordovician	
Turrilepas wrightiana (Turrelipidae)	Welsh borderlands, UK	Wenlock, Middle Silurian	
Turrilepas modzalevskae (Turrelipidae)	Podolia, Ukraine	Lower Ludlow, Silurian	

... and possibly elsewhere
