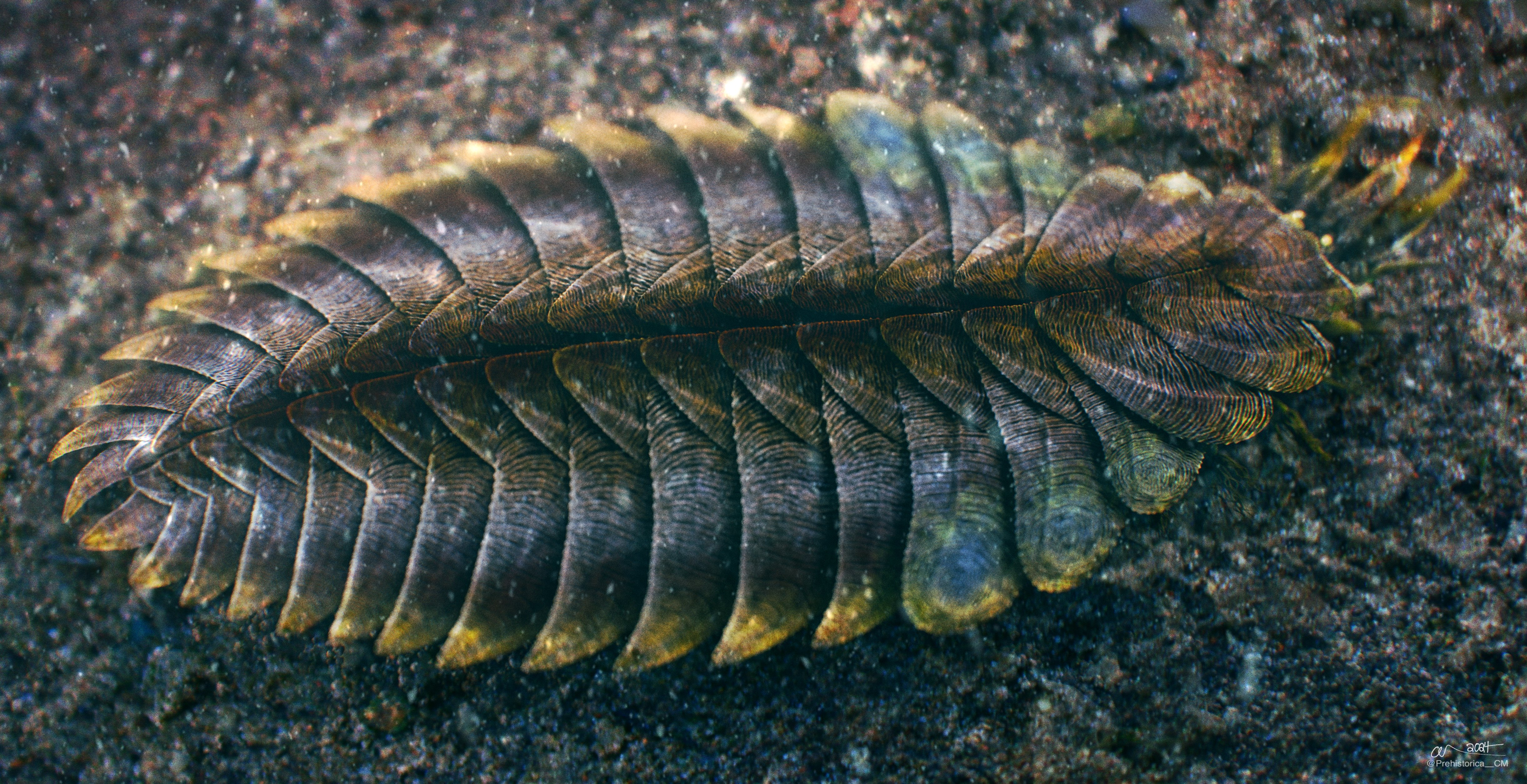
- A digital reconstruction of Plumulites bengstoni
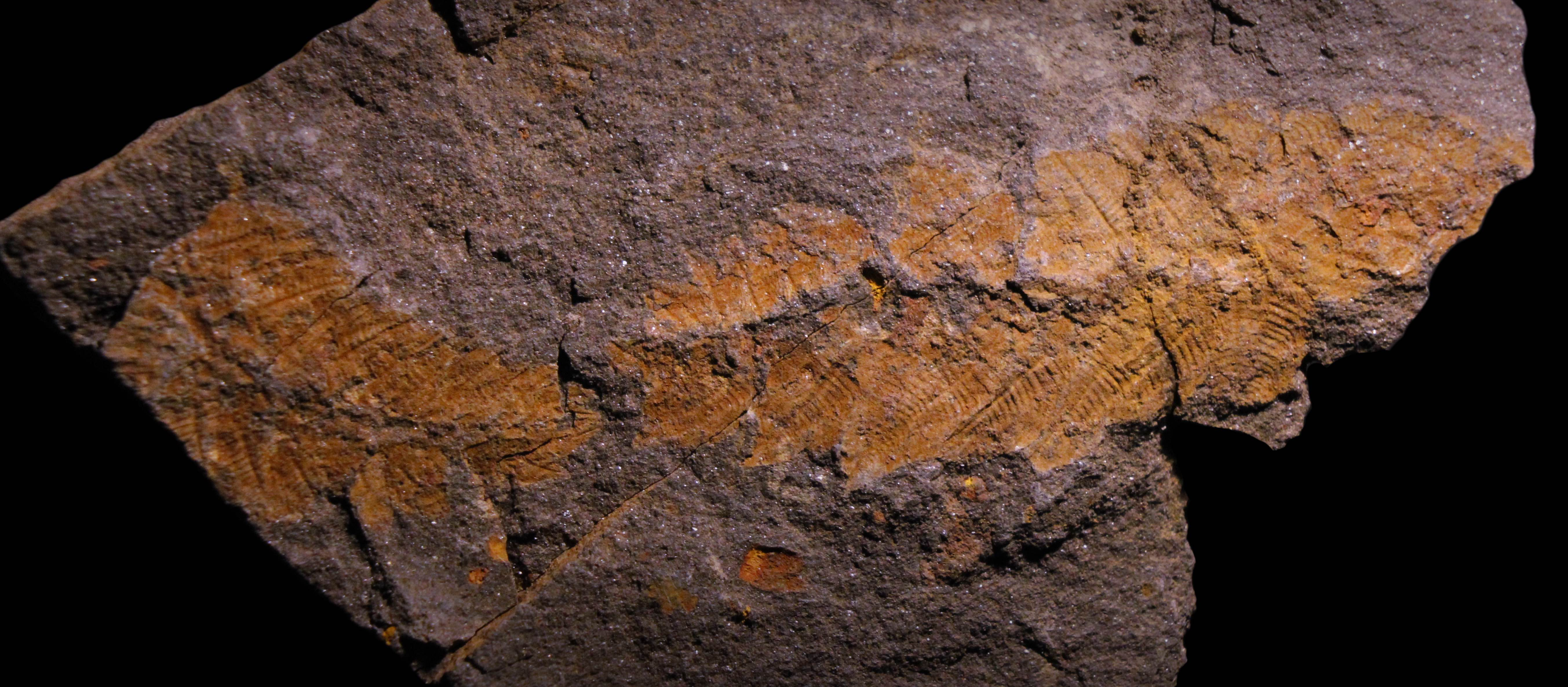
- Fossil of two articulated Plumulites bengstoni

Scientific classification
- Kingdom: Animalia
- Phylum: Annelida
- Clade: Pleistoannelida
- Subclass: Errantia
- Order: Phyllodocida
- Clade: †Machaeridia
- Family: †Plumulitidae; Jell, 1979
- Genus: †Plumulites

Type species
- Plumulites canadensis Woodward, 1889

Species
- See text

= Plumulites =

Plumulites Temporal range: Tremadocian–Middle Devonian

Genus of annelids (fossil)

Plumulites is an extinct genus of machaeridians, an extinct annelid group.

== Description ==
Plumulites is normally small animal, for example complete specimen of P. canadensis reached only 16.5 millimetres (0.65 in), and P. bengtsoni being 28 millimetres (1.1 in). However, several largest specimens probably reached around 15 centimetres (5.9 in), making Plumulites largest machaeridians ever known.

Fossils of Plumulites were mostly known from isolated sclerites, and originally considered as arthropod or an echinoderm. However, complete sclerite assemblages of P. richorum described in 1979 has shown that this animal is more likely to be annelid worm, the group which includes modern-day earthworm, leech and bristleworm.

According to complete specimens, this animal is surrounded by pairs of outer and interior shell plates. Some of anterior outer and interior shell plates different in shape. Specimen of P. bengtsoni shows soft tissue including parapodia and chaetae.

== Taxonomy ==
Preservation of jaw element of P. bengtsoni leads conclusion that machaeridians should be placed within the crown group of Phyllodocida.

=== Species ===
As of 1929, more than 20 species have been described. Subsequent studies have described many more species.

- P. canadensis Woodward, 1889 (type) Ottawa, Canada, Katian (Upper Ordovician)
- P. australis Talent, 1963
- P. bengtsoni Vinther, Van Roy & Briggs, 2008 Fezouata Formation, Morocco, Upper Tremadocian (Lower Ordovician)
- P. bohemicus Barrande, 1868 Bohemia, Czech Republic, Lower Ordovician
- P. chikunensis Kobayashi, 1934 Chikunsan shale (Jigunsan Formation), South Korea, Llandeilian (Middle Ordovician)
- "P". clarki Shaw, 1966 (=?P. mobergi Clark, 1924) Highgate Formation, Vermont, USA, Lower Ordovician
- P. compar Barrande, 1872 Bohemia, Czech Republic, Lower Ordovician
- P. contarius Barrande, 1872 Bohemia, Czech Republic, Lower Ordovician
- P. dalecarlicus Moberg, 1914 Scania, Sweden, Middle Ordovician
- P. delicatus Barrande, 1872 Bohemia, Czech Republic, Lower Silurian
- P. devonicus J. M. Clarke, 1882 Hamilton group, New York, USA, Middle Devonian
- P. discretus Barrande, 1872 Bohemia, Czech Republic, Lower Silurian
- P. esthonicus Withers, 1921 Jewe Station, Esthonia, Middle Ordovician
- P. eueides Högström et al., 2008 Boda Limestone, Siljan district, Sweden, Lower Ordovician (Katian–Hirnantian)
- P. folliculum Barrande, 1868 Bohemia, Czech Republic, Lower Ordovician
- P. fraternus Barrande, 1872 Bohemia, Czech Republic, Middle Ordovician
- P. gracillimus Ringueberg, 1888 Rochester Shale, New York, USA, Middle Silurian
- P. gumunsoensis Choi & Kim, 1989 Dumugol Formation, South Korea, Upper Tremadocian
- P. kutscheri Schrank, 1978 Germany, Upper Wenlock Epoch (Silurian)
- P. lamonti Candela & Crighton, 2017 Law Linn Formation, Pentland Hills, Scotland, Telychian (Silurian)
- P. llanvirnensis Withers & Henry, 1926 Pembrokeshire, Wales, United Kingdom, Skiddavian (Lower Ordovician)
- P. malayensis Kobayashi & Hamada, 1976 Pulau Langgon, Langkawi Islands, Malaysia, Upper Ordovician
- P. minumus Barrande, 1872 Bohemia, Czech Republic, Lower Silurian
- P. mitchelli R. Etheridge, 1890 Bowning Creek, New South Wales, Australia, ?Wenlock Epoch (Silurian)
- P. mobergi T. H. Clark, 1924 Quebec, Canada, Lower Ordovician
- P. ornatus Chapman, 1910 Victoria, Australia, Melbournian (Silurian)
- P. peachi Nicholson & Etheridge, 1880 Ayrshire, Scotland, Ashgillian (Upper Ordovician)
- P. primus Kobayashi, 1934 Dumugol Formation, South Korea, Upper Tremadocian
- P. pygmaeus Moberg, 1914 Dalarna, Sweden, Lower Silurian
- P. rastritum Moberg, 1914 Dalarna, Sweden, Lower Silurian
- P. regius Barrande, 1872 Bohemia, Czech Republic, Middle-Upper Ordovician
- P. richorum Jell, 1979 Humevale Formation, Victoria, Australia, Early Devonian
- P. ruskini Lamont, 1978 Wether Law Linn Formation, Pentland Hills, Scotland, Telychian (Silurian)
- P. scoticus R. Etheridge, 1878 Balclatchie group, Ayrshire, Scotland, Caradocian (Upper Ordovician)
- P. tafennaensis Chauvel, 1967 Morocco, Caradoc (Upper Ordovician) and Tafilalt Biota, Morocco, Katian (Upper Ordovician)
- P. törnquisti Moberg, 1914 Dalarna, Sweden, Middle Ordovician
- P. trentonensis Withers & Henry, 1926 Middle Trenton Beds, New York, USA, Middle Ordovician
- P. yeringiae Chapman, 1910 Victoria, Australia, Yeringian (Silurian)
