= Alcyonidiopsis =

Trace fossil classification
- Ichnogenus: †Alcyonidiopsis; Massalongo, 1856

Ichnospecies
- Alcyonidiopsis longobardiae Massalongo, 1856; Alcyonidiopsis pharmaceus (Ritcher & Ritcher), 1939; Alcyonidiopsis sparsus Salter, 1857

Trace fossil

Alcyonidiopsis is a genus of pellet-filled trace fossil, often branching, known from the Ordovician, or possibly earlier, to the recent. It is associated with the deeper waters of the Nereites ichnofacies. The individual pellets that infill the burrow are sometimes referred to Tomaculum, though this practice is discouraged.

== See also ==
Tubotomaculum, García-Ramos, Jose Carlos; Mángano, María Gabriela; Piñuela, Laura; Buatois, Luis A.; Rodríguez-Tovar, Francisco J. (2015). "The ichnogenus Tubotomaculum: An enigmatic pellet-filled structure from Upper Cretaceous to Miocene deep-marine deposits of southern Spain". Journal of Paleontology. 88 (6): 1189. doi:10.1666/13-123. S2CID 129635502.
