= Flaser bed =

Sedimentary bedding pattern

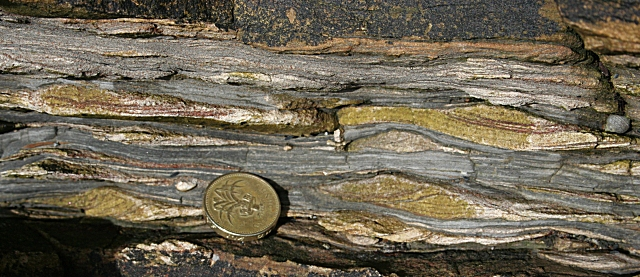
Flaser bedding, vertical section.

Flaser beds are a sedimentary, bi-directional, bedding pattern created when a sediment is exposed to intermittent flows, leading to alternating sand and mud layers. While flaser beds typically form in tidal environments, they can (rarely) form in fluvial conditions - on point bars or in ephemeral streams, or also in deep water environments when turbiditic sediments are reworked by seasonal bottom-currents. Individual sand ripples are created, which are later infilled by mud during quieter flow periods. These mud drapes are typically a minor constituent of the deposit; they can consolidate within three hours, protecting the underlying layer from erosion. Flaser bedding typically forms in high-energy environments.

In contrast to lenticular bedding which largely consists of mud relative to small amounts of sand, flaser bedding is dominated by sand with small amounts of mud interspersed.
