= Lenticular bedding =

Sedimentary bedding pattern displaying alternating layers of mud and sand

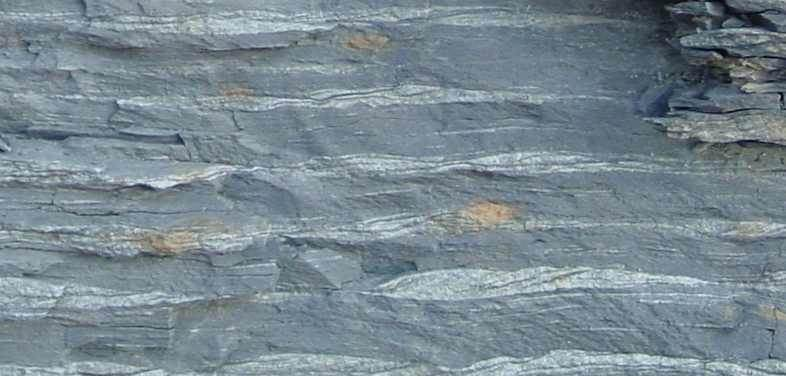
Lenticular bedding formation from the Pennsylvanian of Kentucky. Shows the characteristic large quantities of mud covering 'lens-like' sand.

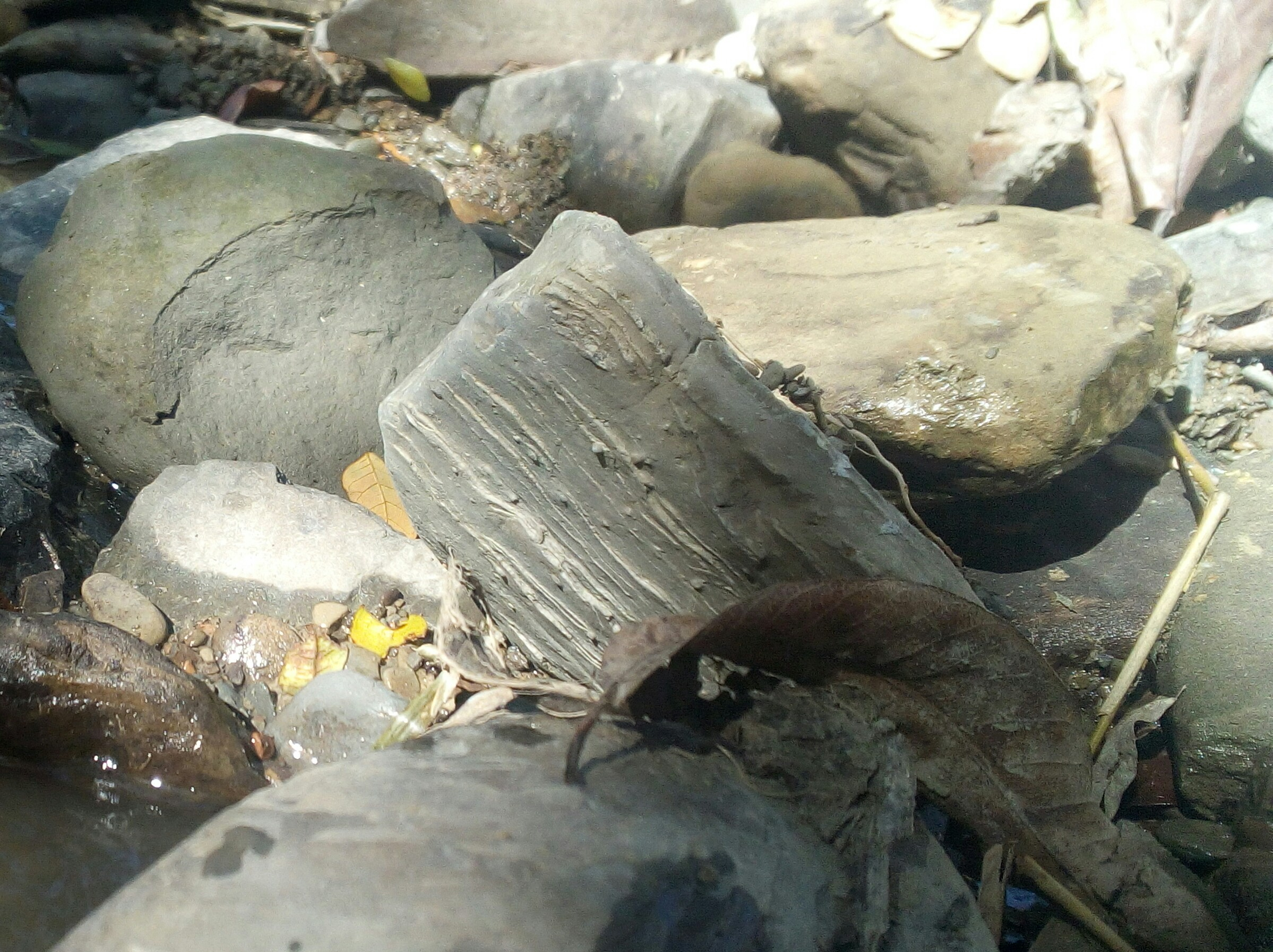
Lenticular bedding

Lenticular bedding is a sedimentary bedding pattern displaying alternating layers of mud and sand. Formed during periods of slack water, mud suspended in the water is deposited on top of small formations of sand once the water's velocity has reached zero. Lenticular bedding is classified by its large quantities of mud relative to sand, whereas a flaser bed consists mostly of sand. The sand formations within the bedding display a 'lens-like' shape, giving the pattern its respected name. They are commonly found in high-energy environments such as the intertidal and supratidal zones. Geologists use lenticular bedding to show evidence of tidal rhythm, tidal currents and tidal slack, in a particular environment.
