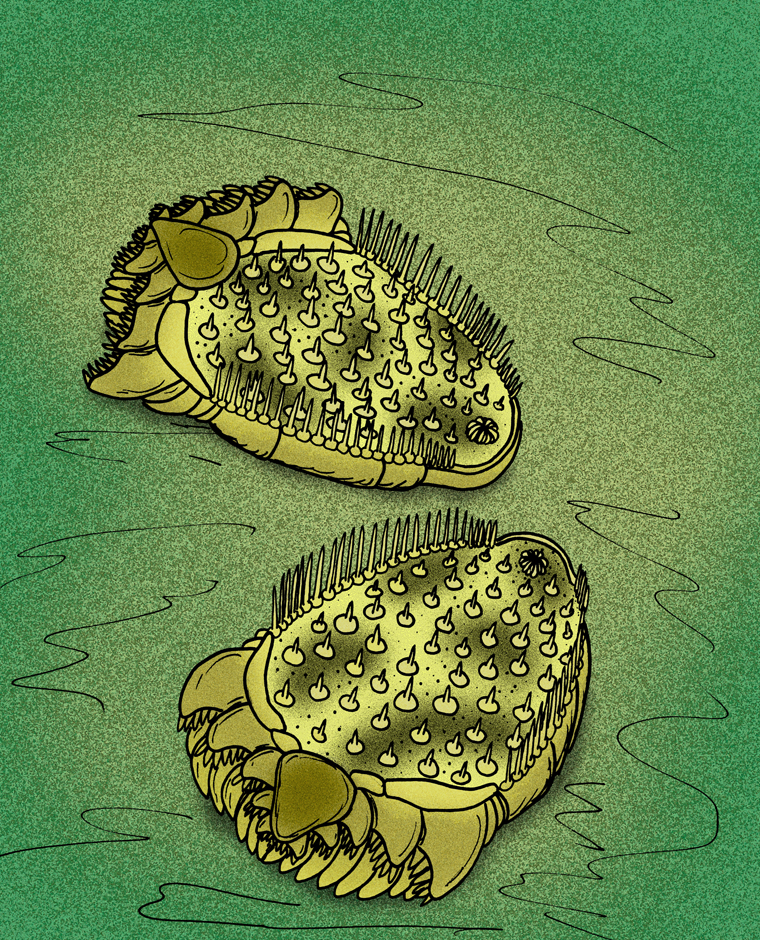
- Artist's restoration

Scientific classification
- Kingdom: Animalia
- Superphylum: Deuterostomia
- Clade: Ambulacraria
- Phylum: Echinodermata
- Genus: †Ctenoimbricata; Zamora, Rahman, and Smith 2012

Type species
- Ctenoimbricata spinosa Zamora, Rahman, and Smith 2012

= Ctenoimbricata =

Ctenoimbricata Temporal range: Wuliuan

Extinct genus of marine invertebrates

Ctenoimbricata is an extinct genus of bilaterally symmetrical echinoderm, which lived during the early Middle Cambrian period (Cambrian Series 3, Stage 5). It contains one species, Ctenoimbricata spinosa. It may be the most basal known echinoderm. It resembles the extinct ctenocystoids and cinctans, particularly the basal ctenocystoid Courtessolea. Ctenoimbricata is interpreted as a deposit-feeding pharyngeal basket feeder. Ctenoimbricata fossil was originally found in the Iberian Chain, NE Spain. The quarry that Ctenoimbricata was discovered in had yielded 2 specimens. It was relatively small, with a body 20 millimetres (0.79 in) long.

== Morphology ==
Comparison of early Echinoderm species with bilateral symmetry.

Ctenoimbricata has a near perfect bilateral symmetry. The morphology of the fossil is intermediate between Ctenocystoidea and Cincta. This provides important insight into understanding the homologies between the multiple groups. Ctenoimbricata has ctenidium that for the feeding apparatus surrounding a large anterior opening, this is similar to that of Ctenocystoidea which is another Bilaterally symmetric privative Echinoderm. Ctenoimbricata is distinguished by a flattened Theca, differentiated ctenidial plating, and the possession of a single layered marginal frame.

== Evolution ==
A cladistic analysis was done in 2013 of Cambrian Echinoderms by Smith and Zamora. They had used nine different fossils and 17 different characters, Through this tree they had found the early evolution of the phylum through bilateral, asymmetrical, triradia, and pentaradial forms. In a more recent study they had discovered that Ctenoimbricata is a Sister taxa to all echinoderms. This would also make it the most Basal (phylogenetics) of the phylum of echinoderms.

== Phylogeny ==
The following phylogenetic tree follows Rahman and Zamora (2024), indicating the most marked type of symmetry for the different taxa.

- Echinodermata (total group)
  - Ctenoimbricata†
  - - Ctenocystis† (a Ctenocystoid†)
    - Courtessolea† (a Ctenocystoid†)
  - - Protocinctus† (a Cinctan† a.k.a. Homostelean†)
    - - - Coleicarpus† (a Solute† a.k.a. Homoiostelean†)
        - ? Ceratocystis† (a Stylophoran†)
      - - Helicoplacus† (a Helicoplacoid†)
        - - Helicocystis†
          - Echinodermata (crown group)
            - Gogia† (an Eocrinoid†)
            - Camptostroma† (an Edrioasteroid†)
            - Crinoidea
            - Eleutherozoa
              - Echinozoa
                - Echinoidea
                - Holothuroidea
              - Asterozoa
                - Asteroidea
                - Ophiuroidea
