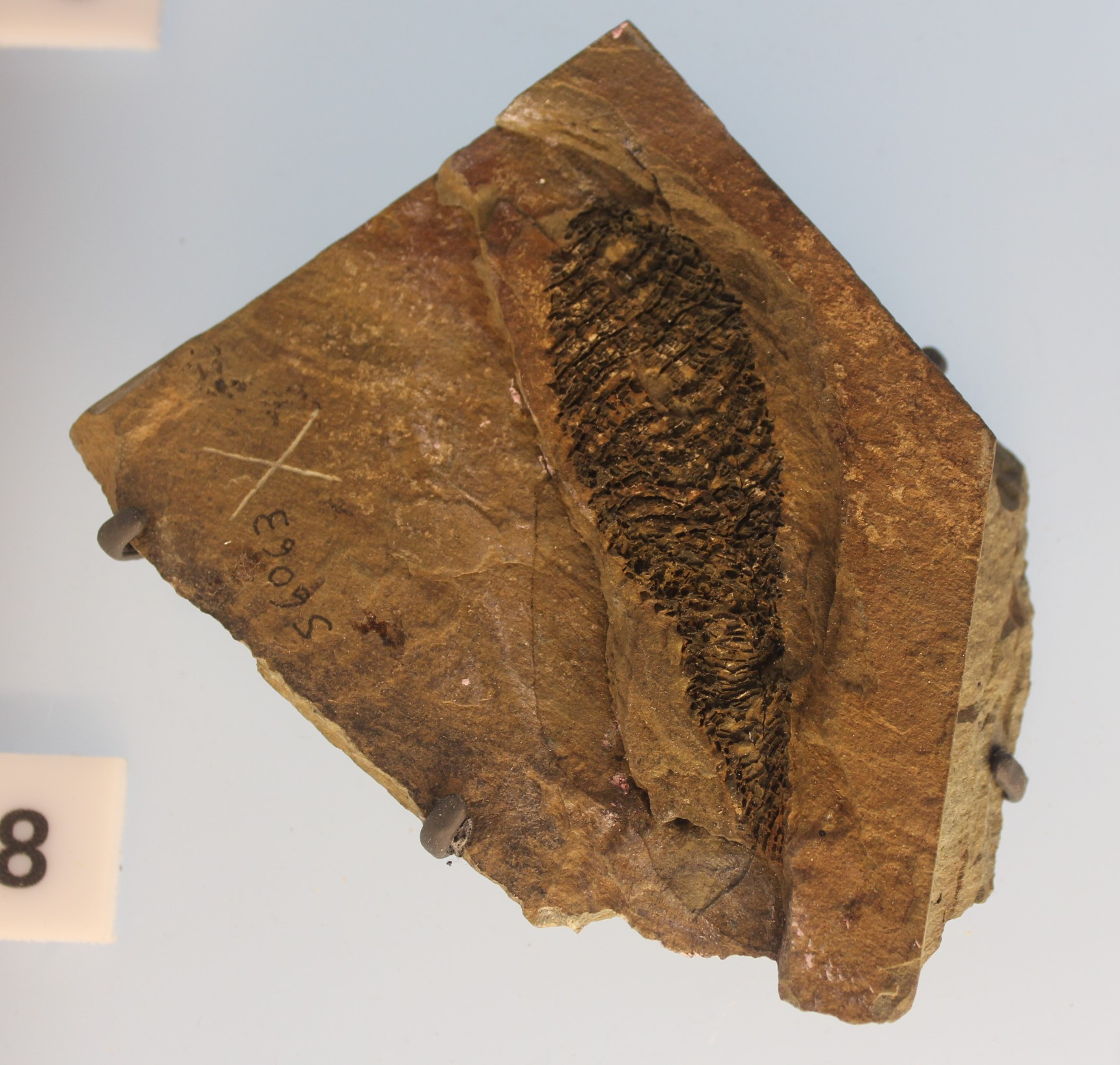
- Helicoplacus gilberti hypotype (USNM 6063), National Museum of Natural History

Scientific classification
- Kingdom: Animalia
- Phylum: Echinodermata
- Class: †Helicoplacoidea
- Family: †Helicoplacidae
- Genus: †Helicoplacus

Species
- †Helicoplacus curtisi; †Helicoplacus guthi

= Helicoplacus =

Helicoplacus Temporal range: Cambrian 516 Ma

Extinct genus of marine invertebrates

Helicoplacus (often misspelled Helioplacus) is the earliest well-studied fossil echinoderm. Fossil plates are known from several regions. Complete specimens were found in Lower Cambrian strata of the White Mountains of California.

The animal was a cigar-shaped creature up to 7 centimetres (2.8 in) long that stood upright on one end. Unlike more typical echinoderms such as sea stars, Helicoplacus does not have fivefold symmetry. Instead, there is a spiral food groove on the outside along which food was moved to a mouth that is thought to be on the side. The respiratory system appears to be primitive. Although the animal does not look like a typical echinoderm, the plates are composed of the characteristic calcareous plates known as stereom that are common to all echinoderms. The ambulacrum is similar to that of the Edrioasteroidea; as a result, Helicoplacus may belong to Pelmatozoa.

Other contemporaneous echinoderms are known to have existed from their dissociated plates, but other than a few possible edrioasteroids, Helicoplacus is the earliest echinoderm that is well enough preserved to analyze its characteristics. One much earlier form called Arkarua has been hypothesized to be an ancestral echinoderm because of its fivefold symmetry, though it appears to lack stereoms and a mouth.

Helicoplacus is thought to have been a suspension feeder living at moderate depths in highly oxygenated water with strong enough currents to ensure a steady food supply. It is typically found in greenish shales and, rarely found in shallow water sandstones and limestones. The helically spiraling rows of plates radiating from the base, which in life probably was anchored in the muddy substrate.

== Stratigraphic distribution ==
Helicoplacus is one of the earliest mineralizing echinoderms, appearing alongside close relatives Polyplacus and Waucobella in the Poleta formation, among strata notable for an exceptional abundance of echinoderm fossils (including also edrioasteroid fragments).

The Poleta Formation is correlated with the as-yet unratified Cambrian Stage 3 (Series 2), giving it a provisional date of around 516 million years ago.

== See also ==
- Helicocystis
- List of prehistoric echinoderms
- List of echinodermata orders
