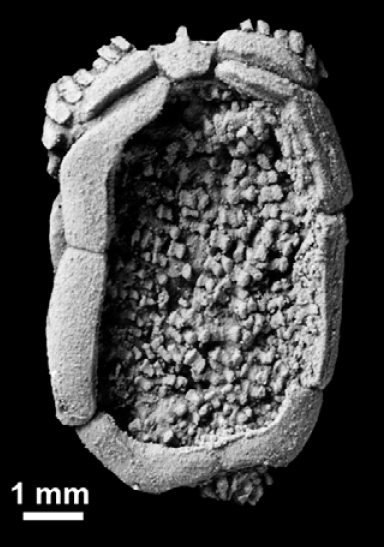
- A specimen of Ctenocystis

Scientific classification
- Kingdom: Animalia
- Superphylum: Deuterostomia
- Clade: Ambulacraria
- Phylum: Echinodermata
- Class: †Ctenocystoidea; Robison & Sprinkle, 1969

Type genus
- Ctenocystis Robison & Sprinkle, 1969

Genera
- †Conollia; †Courtessolea; †Ctenocystis; †Etoctenocystis; †Gilcidia; †Jugoszovia; †Pembrocystis

= Ctenocystoidea =

Ctenocystoidea Temporal range: Wuliuan–Sandbian

Extinct clade of marine invertebrates

Ctenocystoidea is an extinct clade of echinoderms, which lived during the Cambrian and Ordovician periods. Unlike other echinoderms, ctenocystoids had bilateral symmetry, or were only very slightly asymmetrical. They are believed to be one of the earliest-diverging branches of echinoderms, with their bilateral symmetry a trait shared with other deuterostomes. Ctenocystoids were once classified in the taxon Homalozoa, also known as Carpoidea, alongside cinctans, solutes, and stylophorans. Homalozoa is now recognized as a polyphyletic group of echinoderms without radial symmetry. Ctenocystoids were geographically widespread during the Middle Cambrian, with one species surviving into the Late Ordovician.

== Description ==
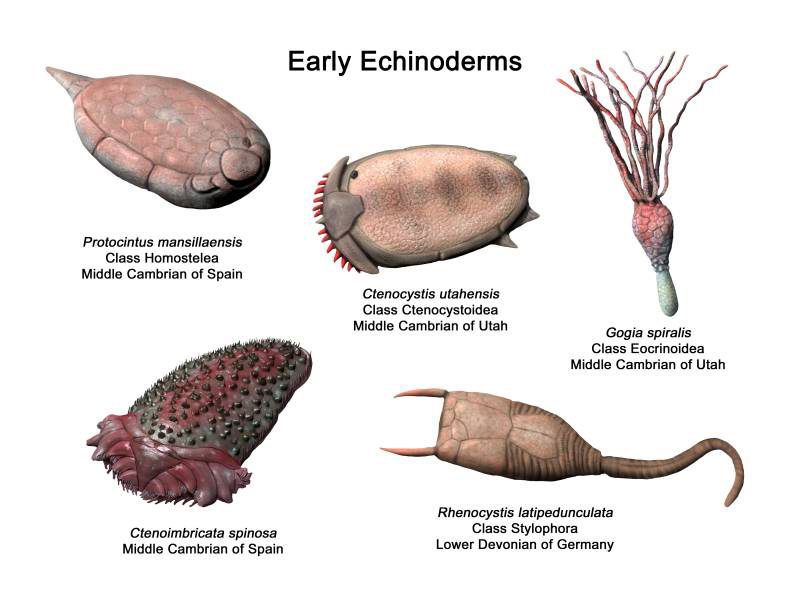
A selection of early echinoderms, including the ctenocystoid Ctenocystis (middle).

Like other echinoderms, ctenocystoids had a skeleton made of stereom plates. Ctenocystoids had near bilateral symmetry, with some species exhibiting slightly asymmetric plate shapes. Like cinctans and Ctenoimbricata, most ctenocystoids had large marginal plates surrounding the sides of their body, but unlike cinctans and Ctenoimbricata, which had only one row of marginal plates, most ctenocystoids had two rows of marginal plates. Courtessolea had only one row of marginal plates, like cinctans and Ctenoimbricata, whereas Conollia lost the marginal plates entirely. The anus of ctenocystoids was surrounded by a pyramidal periproct as in other echinoderms. It was located at the posterior end, defining a clear anterior-posterior body axis unlike other echinoderms.

All ctenocystoids had a ctenoid apparatus, a comb-like arrangement of movable plates at the anterior end of the animal. Beneath the ctenoid apparatus was a mouth, bordered on each side by a food groove.

It appears the right ambulacrum was completely lost early on, with the remaining left ambulacrum dominating the body.

== History ==
The class Ctenocystoidea was named in 1969 by Richard A. Robison and James Sprinkle. It originally contained one species, Ctenocystis utahensis. The name comes from the Greek words ktenos, meaning "comb", and kystis, meaning "sac". It was originally assigned to the echinoderm subphylum Homalozoa.

== Classification ==
=== Relationships ===
Ctenocystoids are likely among the most basal stem-group echinoderms. They have also been interpreted as aberrant blastozoans and as stem-group hemichordates. The presence of stereom plates indicates that they most likely belong to the echinoderm total group, rendering a hemichordate affinity unlikely.

Courtessolea was probably the most basal ctenocystoid, given its anatomical similarities to Ctenoimbricata and cinctans. Conollia and Jugoszovia may be closely related to each other, as both have a reduced marginal frame compared to other ctenocystoids.

- Courtessolea
- - - Jugoszovia
    - Conollia
  - - Pembrocystis
    - - Etoctenocystis
      - - Gilcidia
        - Ctenocystis

Phylogenetic relationships within Ctenocystoidea

=== Genera ===
The following genera of ctenocystoids have been named:

Genus	Discoverers	Named	Age	Location	Notes
Conollia	Domínguez Alonso	1999	Sandbian	United Kingdom	The geologically youngest genus
Courtessolea	Domínguez Alonso	1999	Wuliuan	France	The most basal genus
Ctenocystis	Robison & Sprinkle	1969	Middle Cambrian	United States	The first genus discovered
Etoctenocystis	Fatka & Kordule	1985	Middle Cambrian	Czech Republic	
Gilcidia	Domínguez Alonso	1999	Middle Cambrian	Australia, Denmark, France	
Jugoszovia	Džik & Orłowski	1995	Middle Cambrian	Poland	
Pembrocystis	Domínguez Alonso	1999	Middle Cambrian	United Kingdom	

== Distribution ==
Ctenocystoids were widespread during the Middle Cambrian, and have been found in the United States, the United Kingdom, Australia, France, the Czech Republic, Poland, Spain, and Morocco. The earliest ctenocystoids date to the beginning of Stage 5 of the Cambrian, now known as the Wuliuan age, or possibly slightly earlier, in late Cambrian Stage 4. Most species date to the Wuliuan and Drumian ages of the Cambrian. The geologically youngest ctenocystoid, the only one known from the Ordovician, is Conollia, from the Sandbian of the United Kingdom.
