= Arkarua =

Arkarua Temporal range: Late Ediacaran, about 555 Ma
- Fossil of Arkarua adami

Scientific classification
- Kingdom: Animalia
- Phylum: Echinodermata (?)
- Class: †Edrioasteroidea (?)
- Genus: †Arkarua; Gehling, 1987
- Species: †A. adami

Binomial name
- †Arkarua adami Gehling, 1987

Precambrian fossil

Arkarua adami is a small, Precambrian disk-like fossil with a raised center, a number of radial ridges on the rim, and a five-pointed central depression marked with radial lines of five small dots from the middle of the disk center. Fossils range from 3 to 10 mm in diameter.

Arkarua is known only from the Ediacaran beds of the Flinders Ranges in South Australia. The generic name refers to Arkaroo, a giant snake from the Dreaming of the local Aboriginal people.

Arkarua is suggested to have been a passive suspension feeder.

== Classification ==
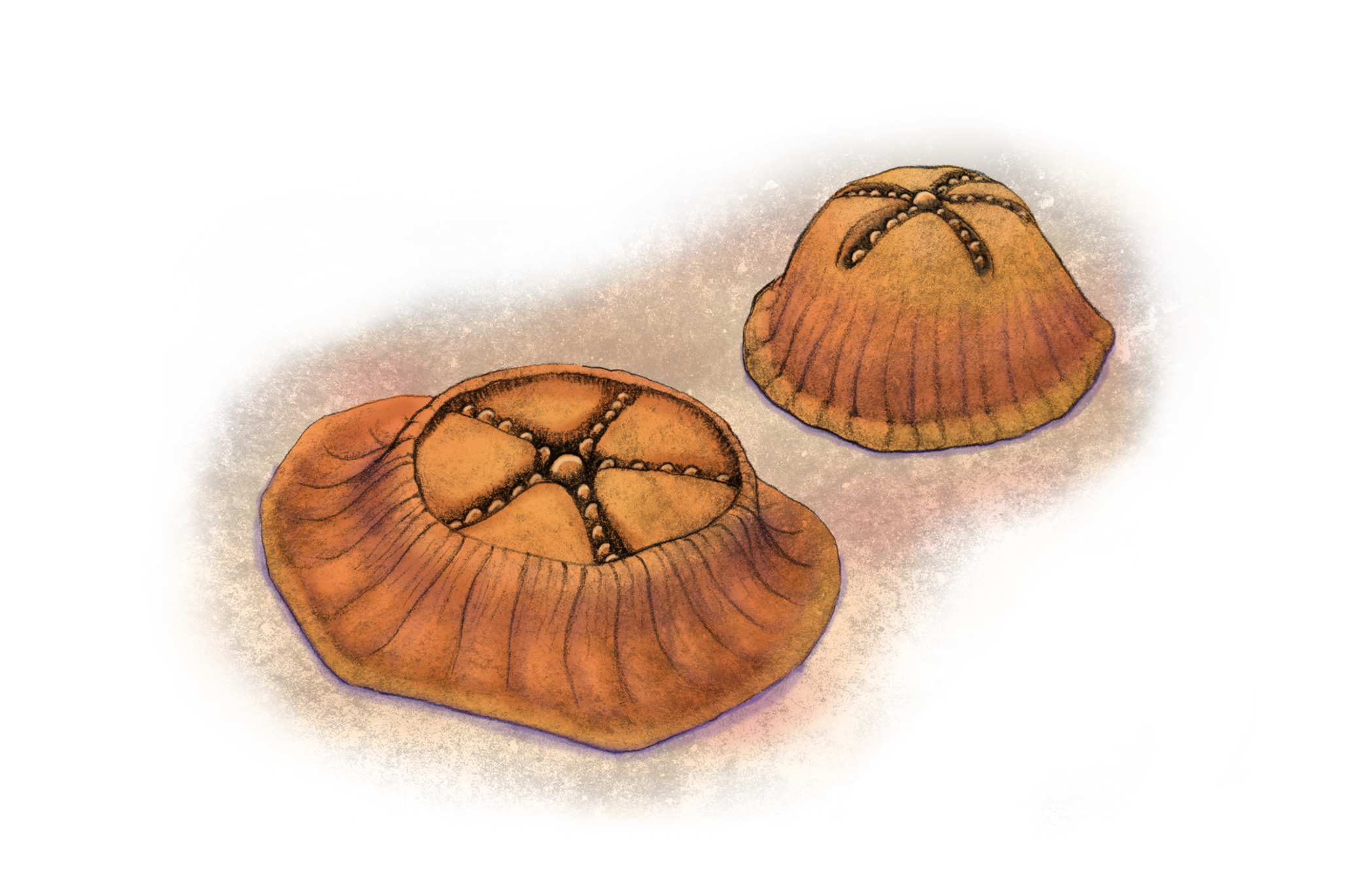
The two probable reconstructions of Arkarua adami, as either a flattened discoidal form, or a rounded discoidal form

All known specimens of Arkarua are casts that give no clue to the internal structure, making classification problematic. Because of Arkarua's pentamerous symmetry, it is tentatively placed within phylum Echinodermata. Because of its flattened disk- or button-shape, coupled with its pentamerous symmetry, some claim that it can be further classified into the Edrioasteroidea, a class of the echinoderms.

This identification remains suspect, as the fossils do not appear to have either madreporites, or plates of stereom, a unique crystalline form of calcium carbonate from which echinoderm skeletons are built. These two features are diagnostic of all other echinoderms, as all extinct and extant echinoderms have either one, the other, or both features present.

== See also ==
- List of Ediacaran genera
