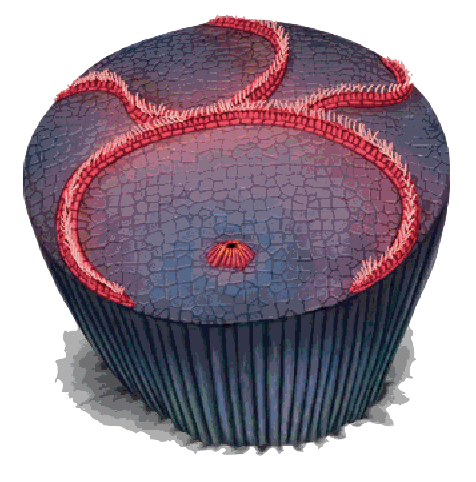
- Artist's reconstruction

Scientific classification
- Kingdom: Animalia
- Phylum: Echinodermata
- Class: †Edrioasteroidea (?)
- Order: †Camptostromatoida
- Family: †Camptostromatidae
- Genus: †Camptostroma; Ruedemann 1933

Type species
- †Camptostroma roddyi Ruedemann 1933

= Camptostroma =

Camptostroma Temporal range: Cambrian Stage 4

Extinct genus of marine invertebrates

Camptostroma is an extinct genus of echinoderm. Camptostroma roddyi from the Bonnia-Olenellus Zone of the Early Cambrian Kinzers Formation near York and Lancaster, Southeastern Pennsylvania, is the only known species in the genus Camptostroma, as other species referred to this genus "do not appear to be cogeneric."

== Anatomy ==
In life, Camptostroma would have resembled a cupcake, with the mouth in the center of the upper surface, with ambulacra radiating from it in the 2-1-2 pattern common in early echinoderms. The ambulacra are straight in juveniles, but in larger adult specimens, ambulacra A, B, C, and E curve clockwise while ambulacrum D curves counter-clockwise. The anus is near the periphery between ambulacra C and D.

The ambulacra may have extended beyond the upper surface on stubby arms. While this diagnosis is tentative, ongoing work appears to support it.

== Classification and relationships ==
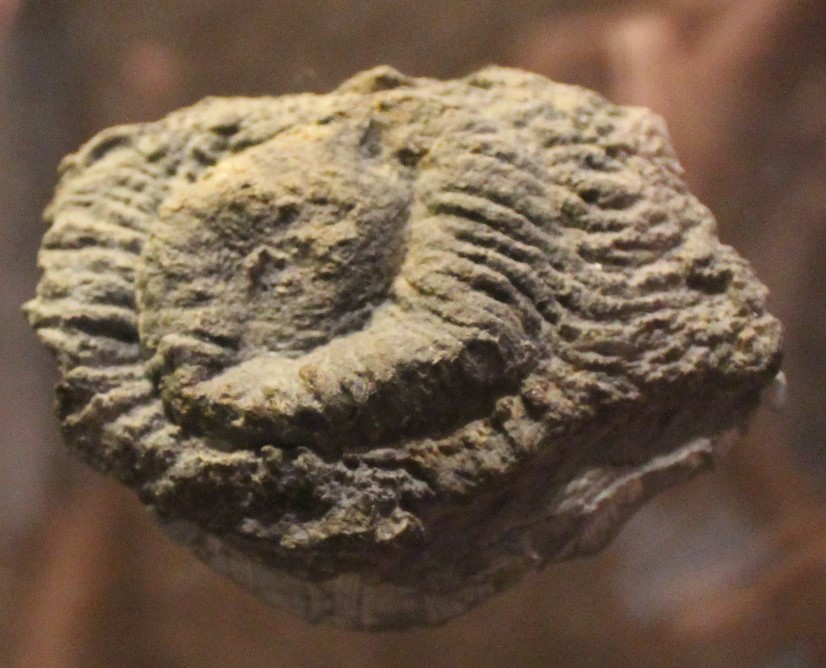
Camptostroma roddyi fossil on display at the Smithsonian's National Museum of Natural History.

While initially considered to be a scyphozoan due to the fossil's medusoid shape, later investigation detected the presence of stereom plates with the calcitic cleavage pattern diagnostic of echinoderms.

The Treatise on Invertebrate Paleontology accepted Durham's 1966 assignment of Camptostroma to its own class, Camptostromatoidea. However, a later classification based on that of the Treatise omitted this class.

Camptostroma has since been placed in a class of basal echinoderms, the Edrioasteroids, although some recent authors only describe it as "edrioasteroid-like".

Recent research has found weak support for the recovery of Camptostroma as the sister group of the crinoids. However, other phylogenies are ambiguous regarding whether it is closer to the crinoids, eocrinoids, or eleutherozoans.
