= Pelmatozoa =

Pelmatozoa Temporal range: 535–0 Ma Middle Cambrian – Recent

Scientific classification
- Kingdom: Animalia
- Clade: Ambulacraria
- Phylum: Echinodermata

Groups included
- Crinozoa †Blastozoa

Extinct group of marine invertebrates

Pelmatozoa was once a clade of Phylum Echinodermata. It included stalked and sedentary echinoderms. The main class of Pelmatozoa were the Crinoidea which includes sea lily and feather star.

Pelmetazoa is no longer a classification of Echinodermata.

Pelmatozoa s.l. (sensu lato) or Crinozoa s.l., were in some systems a large taxon, sometimes considered a subphylum of echinoderms.

The majority of Pelmatozoa s.l. consisted of the extinct taxon Blastozoa.

Pelmatozoa s.s. (sensu stricto) sometimes only include Crinoidea.

== Characteristics ==
The body of these ancient Echinodermates is anchored to the bottom through a stem analogous to the epistome of Phoronidea. They're sessile, only rarely capable of movement. Fossils date back at least to Cambrium so they've been on Earth for over 500 million years.

In the past, they were a numerous group of marine fauna and many groups belong to lead fossils, however today only one smaller class remains extant.

== System (Phylogeny) ==
Pelmatozoa s.l. = Crinozoa s.l.:

- incertae sedis:
  - class †Parablastoidea - single order †Parablastida - sole family †Astroblastocystidae (older name: Blastocystidae)
  - [order] †Echmatocrinida - single genus †Echmatocrinus - sometimes classified as a basal pelmatozoan within or next to Crinoidea, or into holotúrií or outside the Echinoderms into the Octocoralia
- subphylum †Blastozoa
  - class †Lepidocystoidea/order †Imbricata - traditionally within the Eocrinoidea
  - class †Eocrinoidea
    - order †Gogiida
    - order †Trachelocrinida
    - order †Simonkovicrinida - single genus †Simonkovicrinus
    - order †Ascocystitida
  - class †Paracrinoidea - traditionally within the Crinozoa (or less commonly within the Blastozoa as a sister group to Blastoidea); modernly perhaps related to Glyptosphaeritida
    - family †Springerocystidae
    - family †Heckeritidae
    - order †Comarocystitida
    - order †Platycystitida
  - †Cystoidea (Cystoidea/Hydrophoridea) - today considered a paraphyletic taxon; rarely also Cystoidea s.l. also consists of Eocrinoidea (including Lepidocystoidea) and in the widest sense the entirety of Blastozoa
    - family [order] †Diploporita/Diploporida
      - order †Asteroblastida - presently belongs more likely next to Crinoidea
      - order †Glyptosphaeritida/Protocrinitida
      - order †Sphaeronitida s.l.
        - †Sphaeronitida s.s.
        - †Aristocystitida
    - family †Cambrocrinidae s.l. - alternatively considered within the Glyptocystitida
      - family †Cambrocrinidae s.s. - formerly within the Ascocystitida
      - family †Ridersiidae
      - genus †Sanducystis
    - family [order] †Rhombifera/Dichoporita s.l.
      - †Dichoporita s.s.
        - order †Glyptocystitida/Glyptocystitoida - including the taxon †Pleurocystitida (which includes a former order †Hillocystida) and family †Macrocystellidae (formerly put within the Ascocystitida or as a sister taxon to Glyptocystitida)
        - order †Hemicosmitida
      - †Fistuliporita (or Fistuliporida) s.l.
        - order †Polycosmitida
        - order †Caryocystitida/Fistuliporita (or Fistuliporida) s.s.
  - [class] †Blastoidea s.l. - evolutionarily belongs into Cystoidea
    - class †Coronoidea/order †Coronata - this taxon formerly had an inconclusive position
    - family †Lysocystitidae - formerly put within Eocrinoidea
    - class †Blastoidea s.s.
      - genus †Macurdablastus
      - superorder †Spiraculata
        - order †Pentremitida
        - order †Troosticrinida
        - order †Granatocrinida - alternatively placed as a part of the order Troosticrinida
        - order †Nucleocrinida
      - order †Fissiculata

- subphylum Crinozoa or s.s. Pelmatozoa s.s. today consists of only one class, but traditionally consisted of also another taxon - Paracrinoidea
  - class Crinoidea - for classification, see the article Crinoidea

Formerly even Carpoidea/Homalozoa belonged to Pelmatozoa.

Sources for this chapter:
