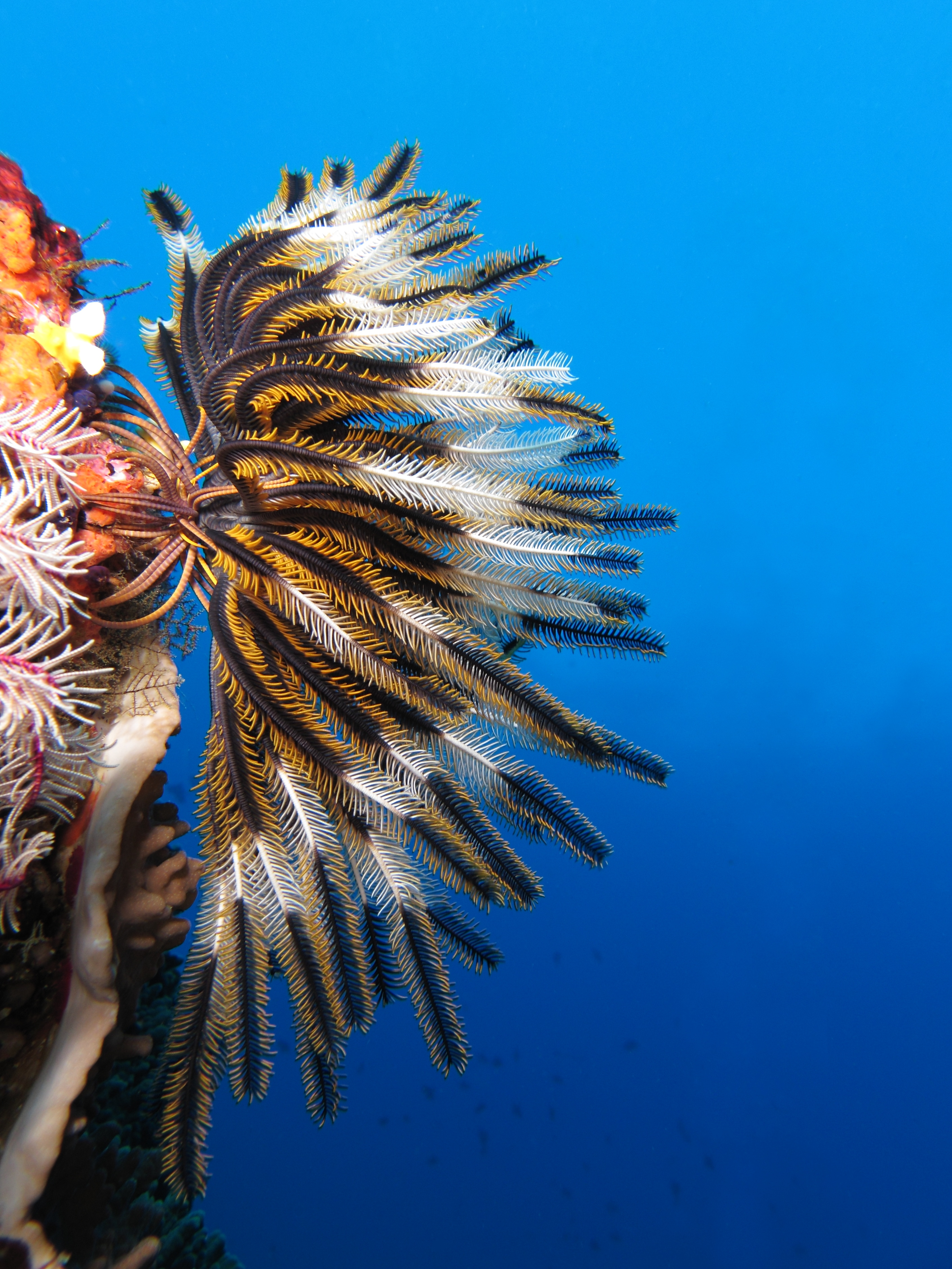
- Crinoid on the reef of Batu Moncho Island, Indonesia

Scientific classification
- Kingdom: Animalia
- Phylum: Echinodermata
- Subphylum: Crinozoa; Matsumoto 1929

Classes
- Crinoidea Miller, 1821; ? Paracrinoidea † Regnéll, 1945; ? Stylophora † Gill & Caster, 1980

= Crinozoa =

Crinozoa Temporal range: Cambrian - Recent

Subphylum of marine invertebrates

Crinozoa is a subphylum of mostly sessile echinoderms, of which the crinoids, or sea lilies and feather stars, are the only extant members. Crinozoans have an extremely extensive fossil history.

== Classes within Crinozoa ==
As published in the Treatise on Invertebrate Paleontology, Crinozoa included all stemmed groups except for the few stemmed basal solutes. When Blastozoa was erected to contain stalked forms with brachioles rather than arms, only Crinoidea and Paracrinoidea remained within Crinozoa. Recent cladistic work has placed Paracrinoidea under Blastozoa, although some sources continue to include Paracrinoidea.

One proposal for the cladistic placement of the Homalozoan classes groups Stylophora together with crinoids to form Crinozoa. A 2024 survey of recent research finds more support for Homalozoa as a paraphyletic assemblage along the echinoderm stem group, but noted that the position of Stylophora in particular was uncertain.

If neither Paracrinoidea nor Stylophora can be included, Crinozoa would be equivalent to the Crinoidea total group.

== See also ==
- List of echinoderm orders
- Blastoids, superficially similar-appearing echinoderms that belong to a different echinoderm subphylum.
