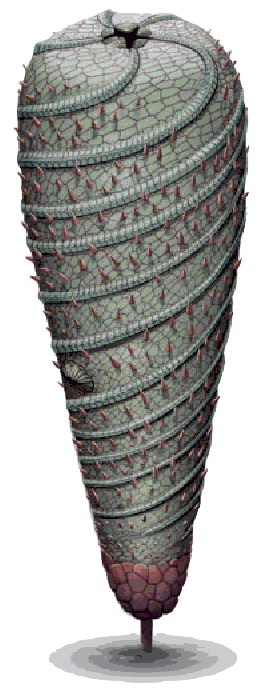

Scientific classification
- Kingdom: Animalia
- Stem group: Echinodermata
- Family: †Helicocystitidae
- Genus: †Helicocystis
- Species: †H. moroccoensis

Binomial name
- †Helicocystis moroccoensis Smith & Zamora, 2013

= Helicocystis =

Helicocystis Temporal range: Miaolingian

Extinct genus of marine invertebrates

Helicocystis is an extinct genus of early echinoderm known from the Jbel Wawrmast Formation of Morocco, dating to the Cambrian Stage 5 (approximately 507 million years ago). It represents a significant transitional fossil in the evolutionary history of echinoderms, as it possesses a pentaradial (five-fold) body plan while maintaining characteristics of more primitive, spiral-shaped ancestors.

== Description ==
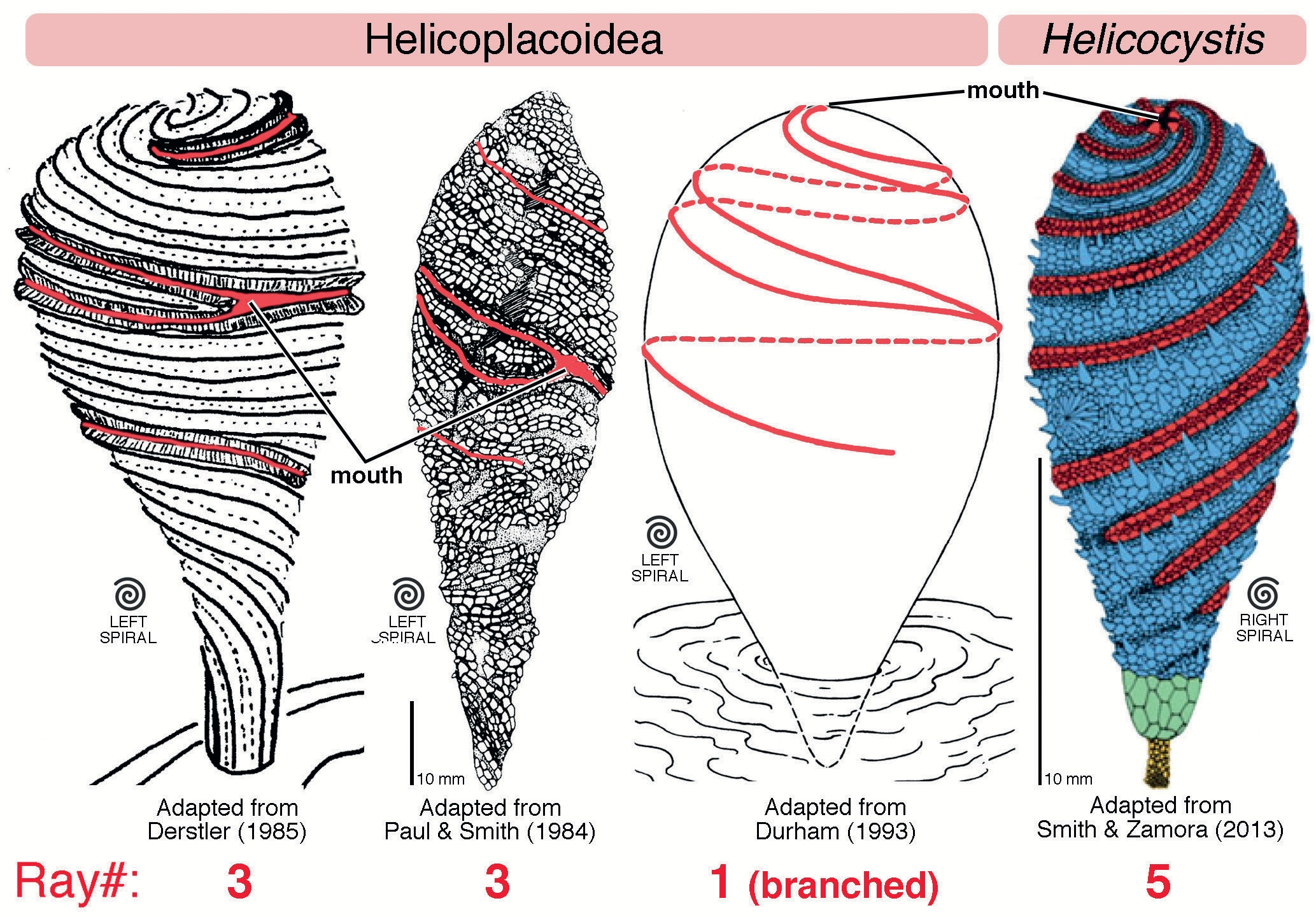
Helicocystis (right) and several reconstructions and diagrams of helicoplacoids

The Helicocystis can be described as a stalked, spiralling pentaradial echinoderm known from the Cambrian Jbel Wawrmast Formation. The approximate length is between 5 and 20 millimeters (0.2 to 0.8 inches)

== Ecology ==
Like other early echinoderms, Helicocystis was a marine organism that fed on plankton.
