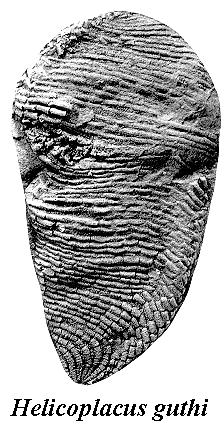
- The holotype specimen of Helicoplacus guthi

Scientific classification
- Kingdom: Animalia
- Phylum: Echinodermata
- Subphylum: Echinozoa
- Class: †Helicoplacoidea; Durham and Caster, 1963

Families
- †Helicoplacidae; †Westgardellidae

= Helicoplacoidea =

Helicoplacoidea Temporal range: Middle Cambrian–Late Cambrian

Extinct class of echinoderms

Helicoplacoidea is an extinct class within the Echinodermata. All known taxa were discovered in sediments dating back to the Cambrian.

== Description ==
Helicoplacoid skeletons consist of small platelets arranged like those of asteroids, lacking fused skeletons as in echinoids. Little is known about their ecology, besides that they were most likely sessile suspension feeders. Members of the group were able to expand and contract their bodies, and some have speculated that they may have largely fed at night. Others say that they were adapted to the more stratified sediment of the Cambrian and that changes in the composition of this sediment resulted in their extinction. Most likely the extending and contracting played a role in gas exchange and nutrition intake as it generated a water current. They seem to be one of the oldest groups of echinoderms, and also one of the first to go extinct, as they first appeared some 530 million years ago and would go extinct around 516 million years ago.

== Fossils and taxonomy ==
Most of the fossils are from White Mountains, Nevada. The rarity of fossils and general poor preservation of them has made it hard to determine any kind of phylogeny for them, though three genera (Helicoplacus, Polyplacus and Waucobella) are currently recognized. Also due to this, it is difficult to establish a conclusive taxonomic classification of the Helicoplacoidea.

A list of helicoplacoid genera, as recognized by the Paleobiology Database, is as follows:

Family †Helicoplacidae

†Helicoplacus Durham & Caster, 1963
†Polyplacus Durham, 1967
†Waucobella Durham, 1967

Helicoplacus guthi, one of two species of Helicoplacus, was named after the fossil's discoverer, Peter Guth. However, Wilbur (2006) suggests that this specimen is actually a poorly preserved specimen of Helicoplacus gilberti. This fossil measured 3.3 cm, and comes from the Cambrian formation of Poleta, California.
