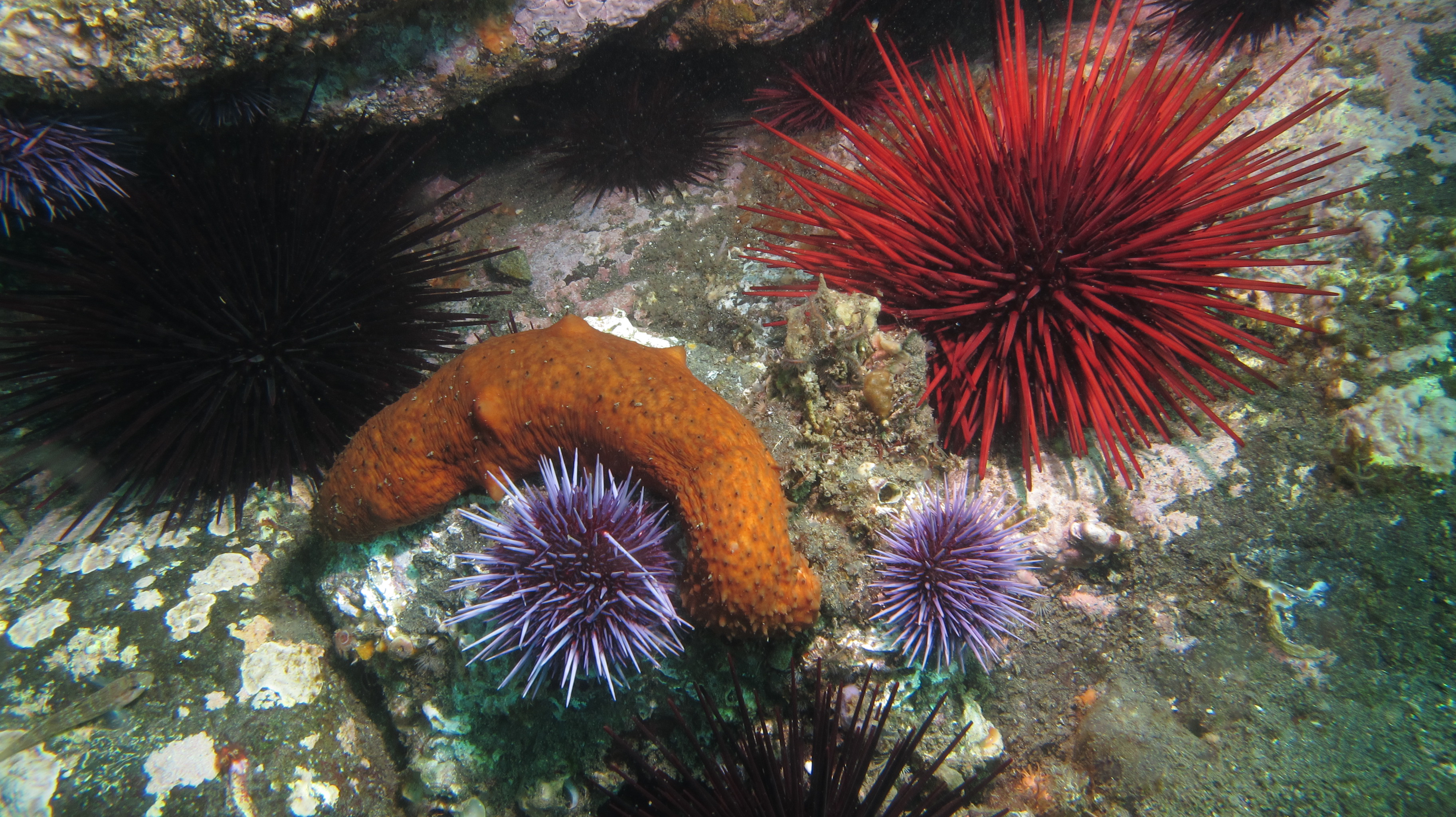
- A sea cucumber (Apostichopus californicus) among sea urchins (Strongylocentrotus purpuratus and Mesocentrotus franciscanus) in California, United States

Scientific classification
- Kingdom: Animalia
- Phylum: Echinodermata
- Subphylum: Echinozoa

Classes
- Echinoidea (sea urchins); Holothuroidea (sea cucumbers); †Ophiocistioidea; incertae sedis; †Bolboporites ?; † = Extinct

= Echinozoa =

Echinozoa Temporal range: Early Ordovician–Present

Subphylum of marine invertebrates

Echinozoa is a subphylum of free-living echinoderms in which the body is or originally was a modified globe with meridional symmetry. Echinozoans lack arms, brachioles or other appendages, and do not at any time exhibit pinnate structure. Their two extant classes are the sea urchins and the sea cucumbers.

== See also ==
- List of echinodermata orders
