= Stereom =

Calcium carbonate material echinoderms are made of

Stereom is a calcium carbonate material that makes up the internal skeletons found in all echinoderms, both living and fossilized forms. It is a sponge-like porous structure which, in a sea urchin may be 50% by volume living cells, and the rest being a matrix of calcite crystals. The size of openings in stereom varies in different species and in different places within the same organism. When an echinoderm becomes a fossil, microscopic examination is used to reveal the structure and such examination is often an important tool to classify the fossil as an echinoderm or related creature.

== Evolution ==
Stereom was the first form of biomineralization to evolve in deuterostomes, predating the evolution of spicules in tunicates and bone in vertebrates. Stereom likely evolved before other distinctive traits of echinoderms, such as radial symmetry, as it is present in basal echinoderms with bilaterally symmetric or asymmetric body plans. Stereom may have evolved alongside a transition in ocean chemistry from an aragonite sea to a calcite sea, which occurred late in Cambrian Stage 2.

In the largely falsified calcichordate hypothesis, stereom was believed to have been present in the common ancestor of echinoderms and vertebrates. However, the genes which code for stereom are unique to echinoderms, indicating that it is likely that stereom is a synapomorphy of echinoderms, and that all stereom-bearing fossil taxa belong to the echinoderm total group.
