= Calcite =

Calcium carbonate mineral

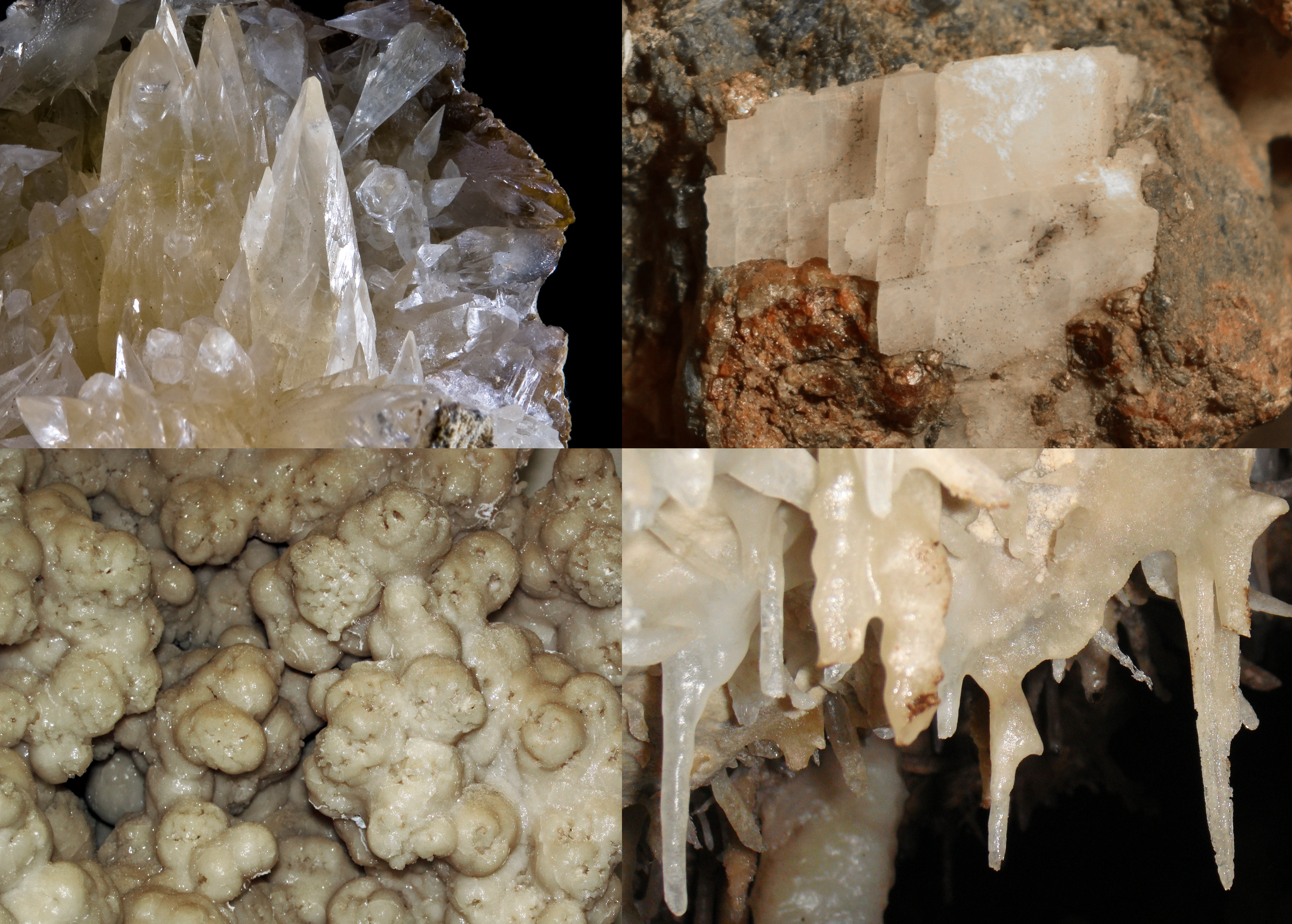
- Clockwise from top left: scalenohedral, rhombohedral, stalactitic, and botryoidal calcite

General
- Category: Carbonate mineral
- Formula: CaCO_{3}
- IMA symbol: Cal
- Strunz classification: 5.AB.05
- Crystal system: Trigonal
- Crystal class: Hexagonal scalenohedral (3̅m); H-M symbol: (3̅ 2/m)
- Space group: R3̅c
- Unit cell: a = 4.9896(2) Å, c = 17.0610(11) Å; Z = 6

Identification
- Color: Typically colorless or creamy white – may have shades of brownish colors
- Crystal habit: Botryoidal, concretionary, druse, globular, granular, massive, rhombohedral, scalenohedral, stalactitic
- Twinning: Common by four twin laws
- Cleavage: Perfect on {101̅1} three directions with angle of 74° 55'
- Fracture: Conchoidal
- Tenacity: Brittle
- Mohs scale hardness: 3 (defining mineral)
- Luster: Vitreous to pearly on cleavage surfaces
- Streak: White
- Diaphaneity: Transparent to translucent
- Specific gravity: 2.71
- Optical properties: Uniaxial (−); low relief
- Refractive index: n_{ω} = 1.640–1.660 n_{ε} = 1.486
- Birefringence: δ = 0.154–0.174
- Fusibility: Infusible (decrepitates energetically)
- Solubility: Soluble in dilute acids
- Other characteristics: May fluoresce red, blue, yellow, and other colors under either SW and LW UV; phosphorescent

Calcite (English: /ˈkælˌsaɪt/) is a carbonate mineral and the most stable polymorph of calcium carbonate (CaCO_{3}). It is a very common mineral, particularly as a component of limestone. Calcite defines hardness 3 on the Mohs scale of mineral hardness, based on scratch hardness comparison. Large calcite crystals are used in optical equipment, and limestone composed mostly of calcite has numerous uses.

Other polymorphs of calcium carbonate are the minerals aragonite and vaterite. Aragonite will change to calcite over timescales of days or less at temperatures exceeding 300 °C, and vaterite is even less stable.

== Etymology ==
Calcite is derived from the German Calcit, a term from the 19th century that came from the Latin word for lime, calx (genitive calcis) with the suffix -ite used to name minerals. It is thus a doublet of the word chalk.

When applied by archaeologists and stone trade professionals, the term alabaster is used not just as in geology and mineralogy, where it is reserved for a variety of gypsum; but also for a similar-looking, translucent variety of fine-grained banded deposit of calcite.

== Unit cell and Miller indices ==
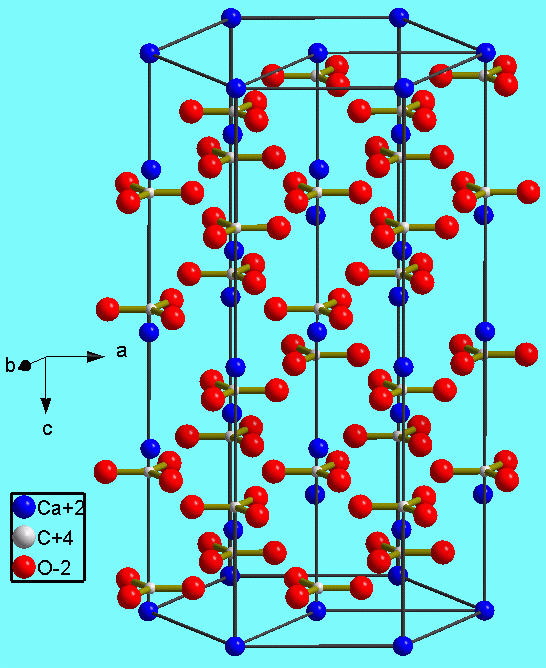
Crystal structure of calcite

In publications, two different sets of Miller indices are used to describe directions in hexagonal and rhombohedral crystals, including calcite crystals: three Miller indices h, k, l in the $a_1, a_2, c$ directions, or four Bravais–Miller indices h, k, i, l in the $a_1,a_2,a_3,c$ directions, where $i$ is redundant but useful in visualizing permutation symmetries.

To add to the complications, there are also two definitions of unit cell for calcite. One, an older "morphological" unit cell, was inferred by measuring angles between faces of crystals, typically with a goniometer, and looking for the smallest numbers that fit. Later, a "structural" unit cell was determined using X-ray crystallography. The morphological unit cell is rhombohedral, having approximate dimensions a = 10 Å and c = 8.5 Å, while the structural unit cell is hexagonal (i.e. a rhombic prism), having approximate dimensions a = 5 Å and c = 17 Å. For the same orientation, c must be multiplied by 4 to convert from morphological to structural units. As an example, calcite cleavage is given as "perfect on {1 0 1̅ 1}" in morphological coordinates and "perfect on {1 0 1̅ 4}" in structural units. In $\{hkl\}$ indices, these are {1 0 1} and {1 0 4}, respectively. Twinning, cleavage and crystal forms are often given in morphological units.

== Properties ==
The diagnostic properties of calcite include a defining Mohs hardness of 3, a specific gravity of 2.71 and, in crystalline varieties, a vitreous luster. Color is white or none, though shades of gray, red, orange, yellow, green, blue, violet, brown, or even black can occur when the mineral is charged with impurities.

=== Crystal habits ===
Calcite has numerous habits, representing combinations of over 1000 crystallographic forms. Most common are scalenohedra, with faces in the hexagonal {2 1 1} directions (morphological unit cell) or {2 1 4} directions (structural unit cell); and rhombohedral, with faces in the {1 0 1} or {1 0 4} directions (the most common cleavage plane). Habits include acute to obtuse rhombohedra, tabular habits, prisms, or various scalenohedra. Calcite exhibits several twinning types that add to the observed habits. It may occur as fibrous, granular, lamellar, or compact. A fibrous, efflorescent habit is known as lublinite. Cleavage is usually in three directions parallel to the rhombohedron form. Its fracture is conchoidal, but difficult to obtain.

Scalenohedral faces are chiral and come in pairs with mirror-image symmetry; their growth can be influenced by interaction with chiral biomolecules such as L- and D-amino acids. Rhombohedral faces are not chiral.

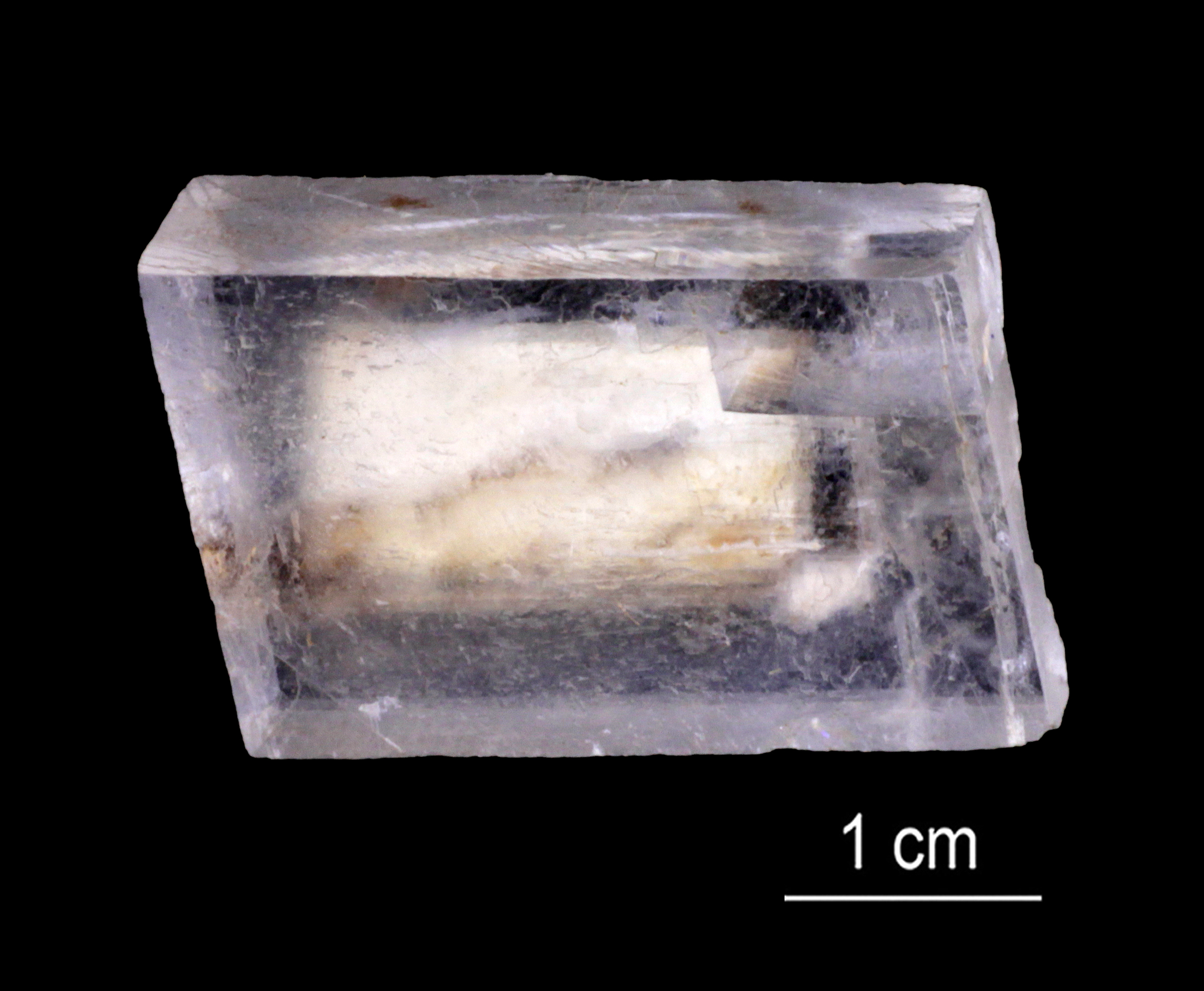
Rhombohedral calcite

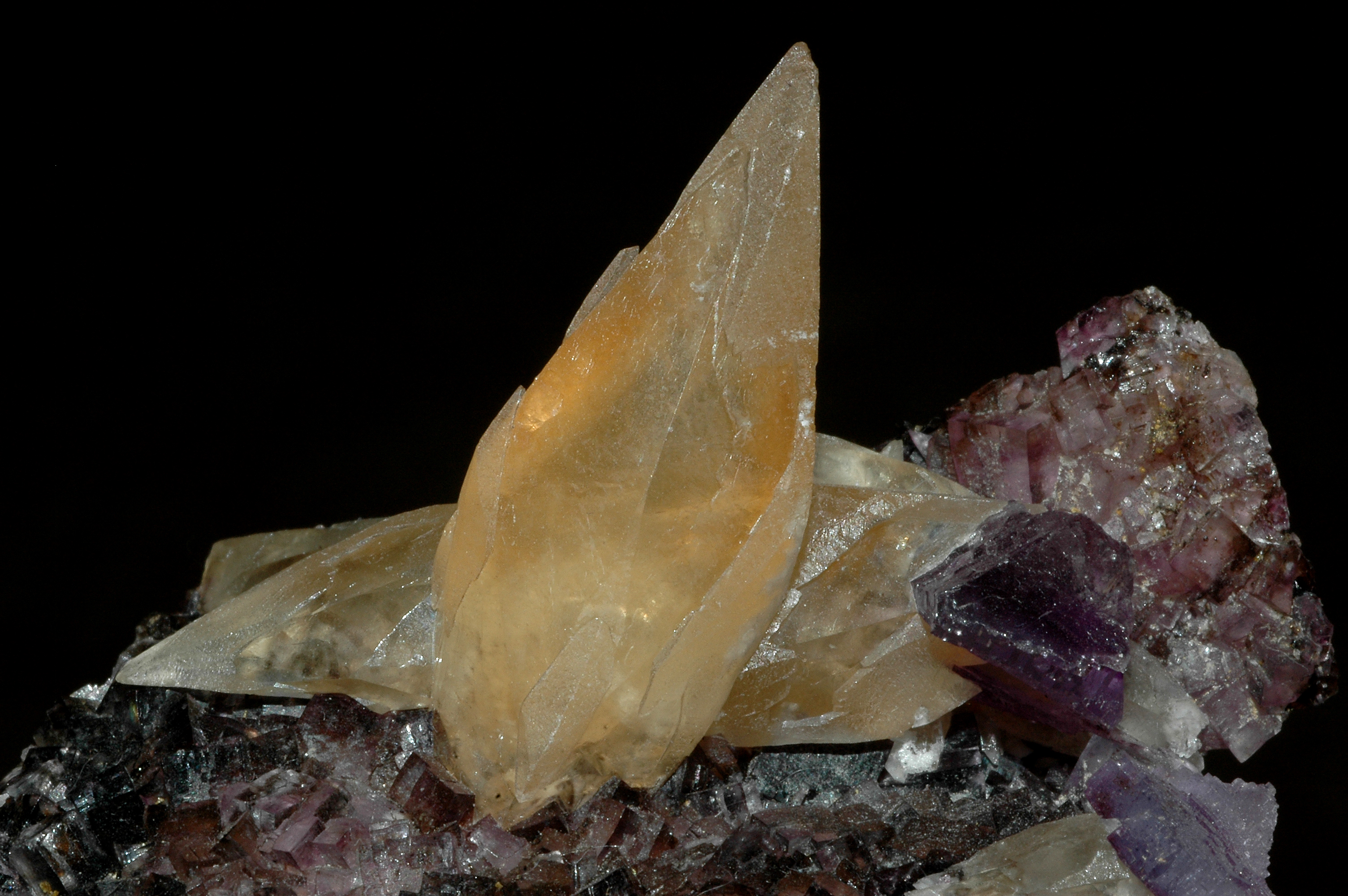
Scalenohedral calcite

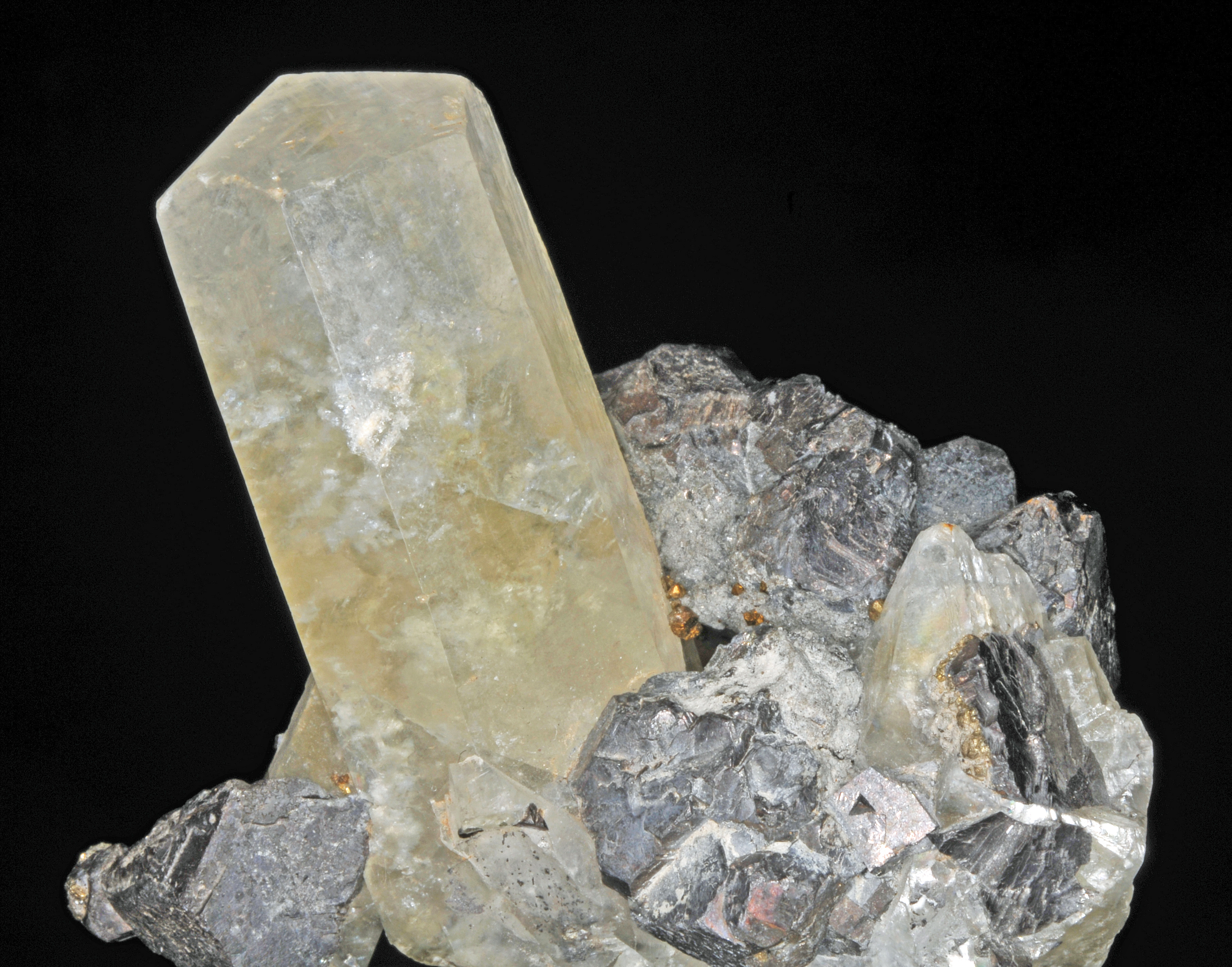
Prismatic calcite

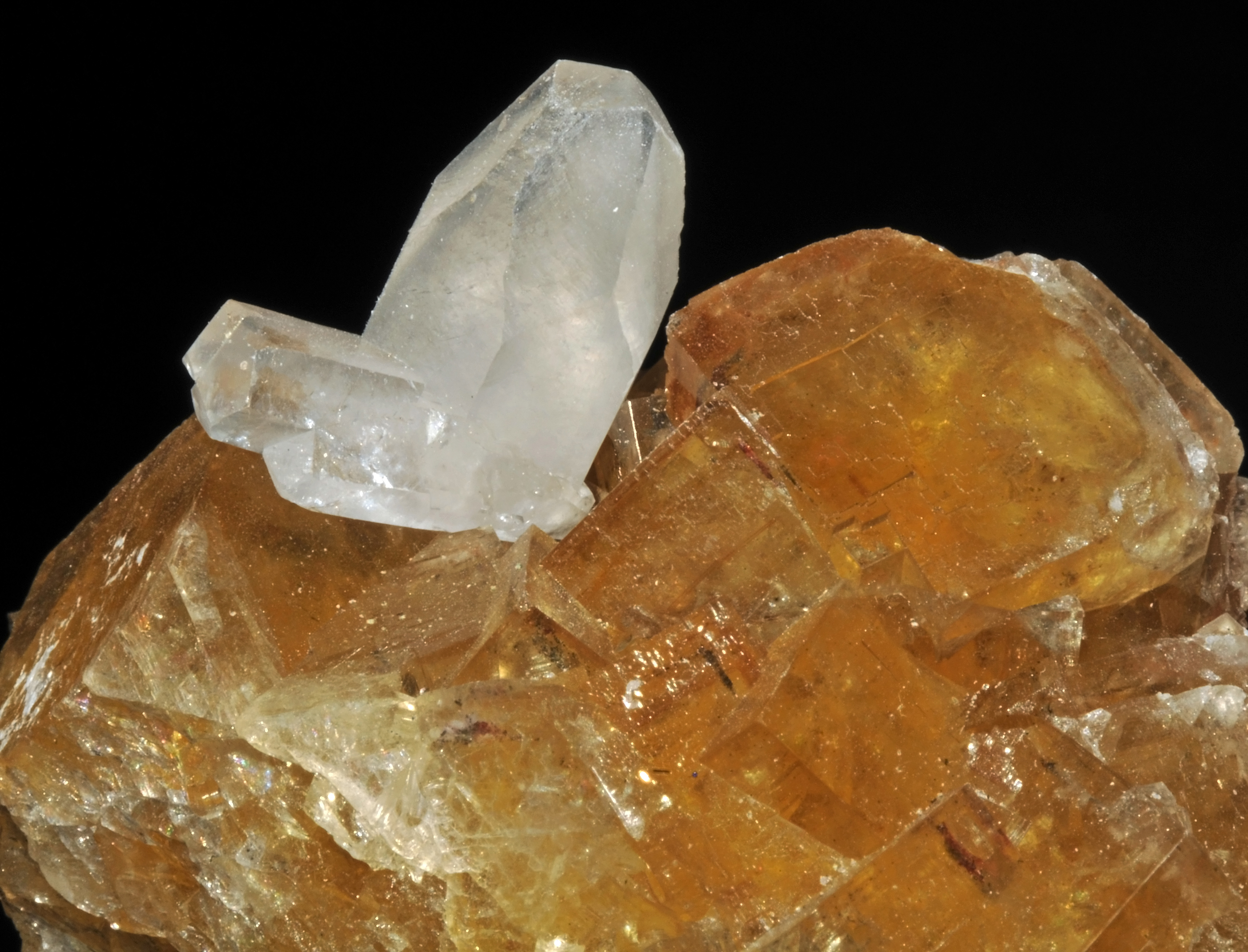
Prismatic calcite

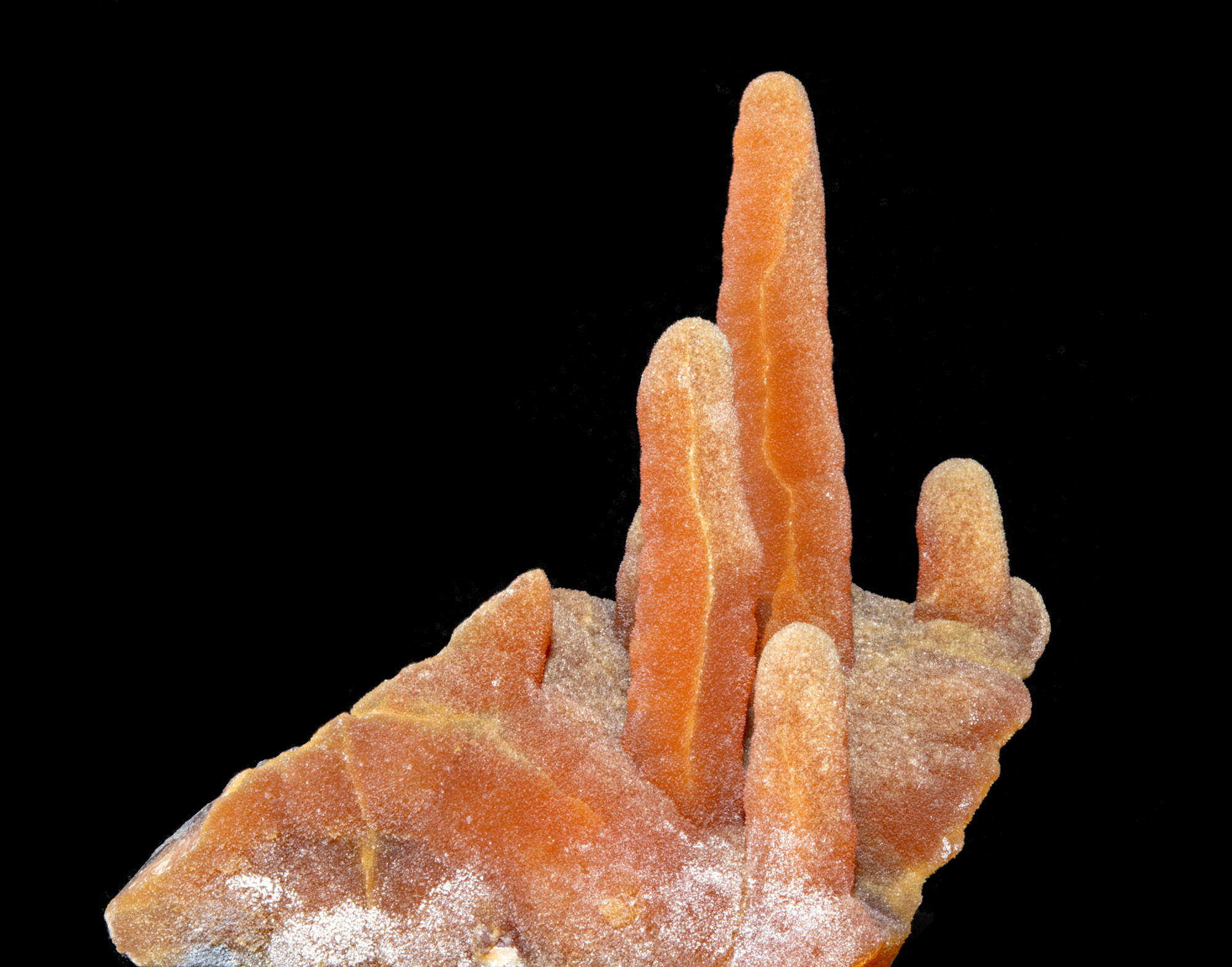
Stalactitic calcite

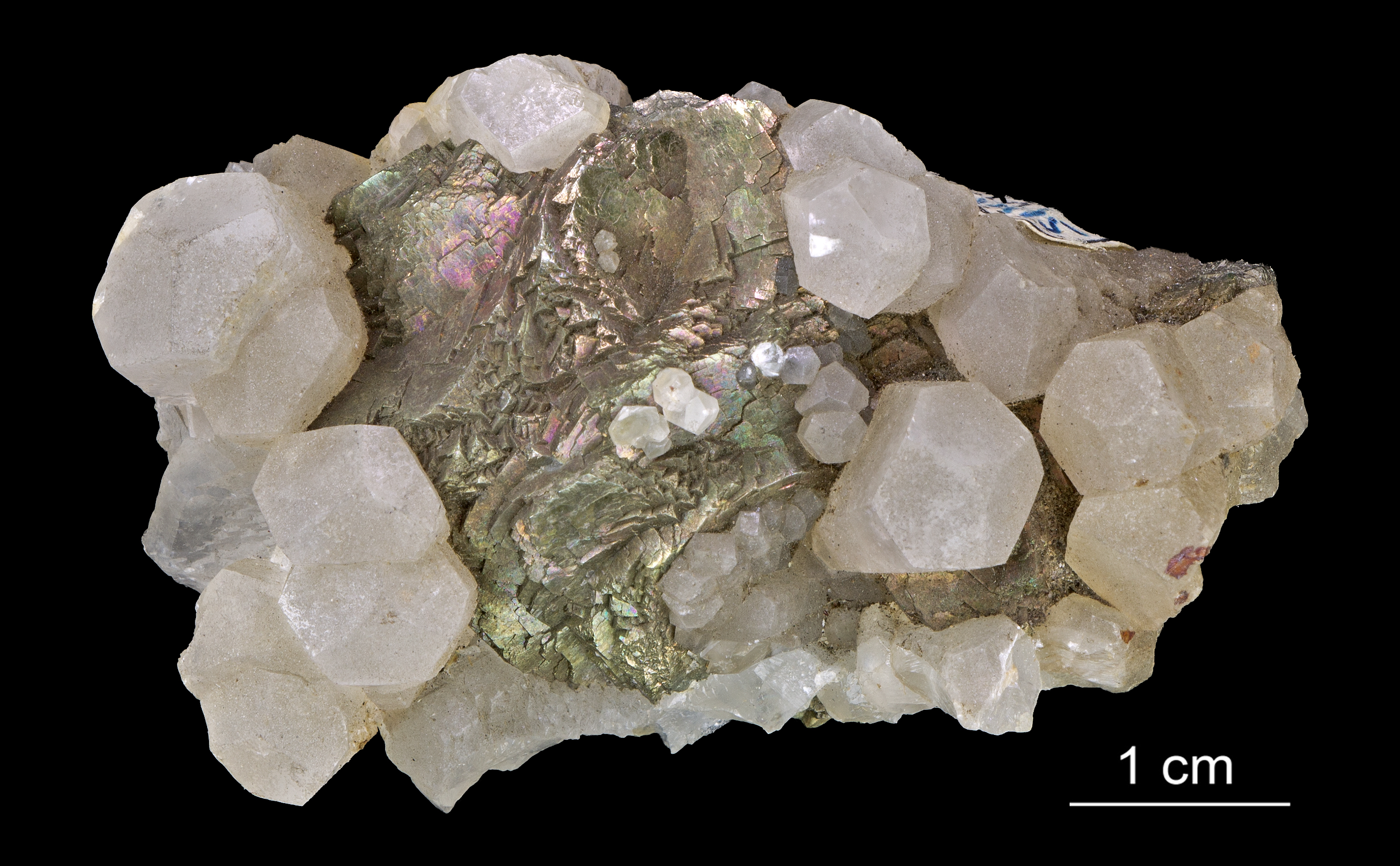
Hexagonal calcite

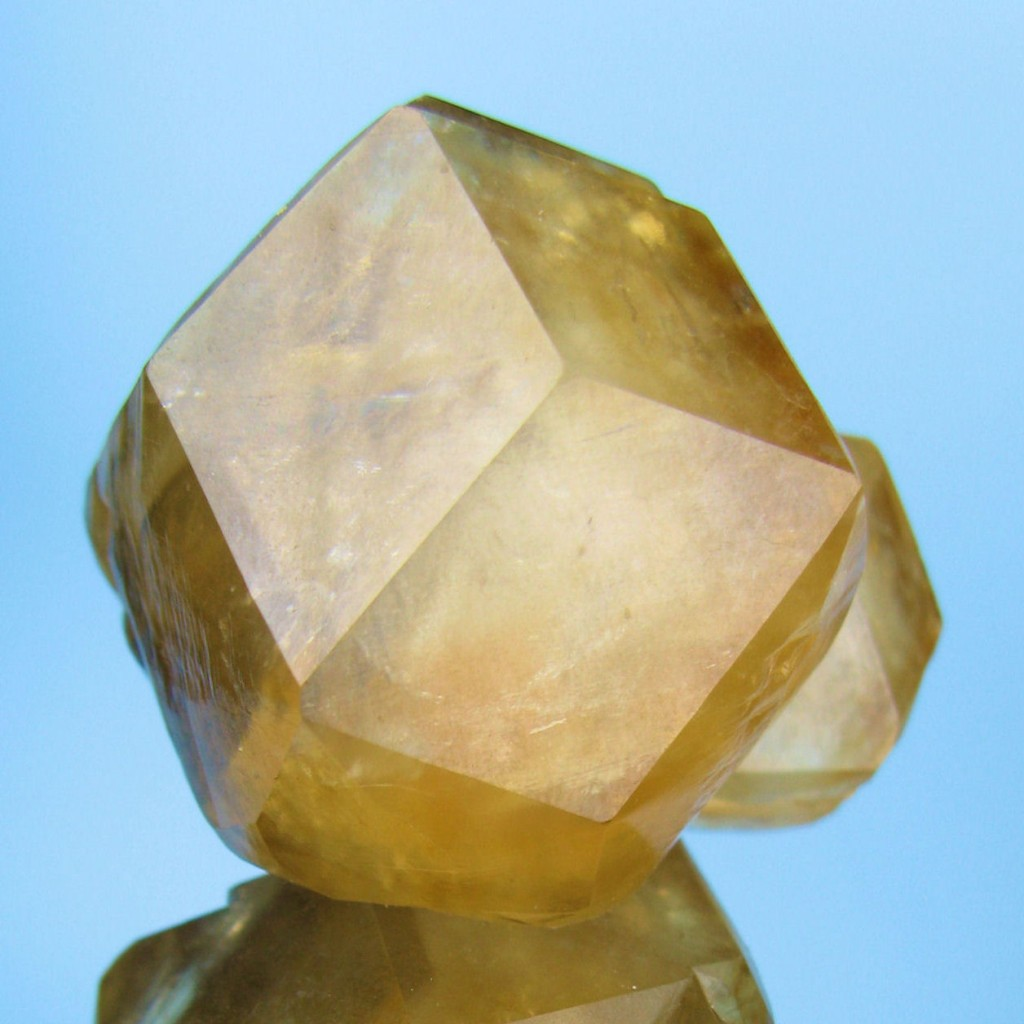
Dodecahedral calcite

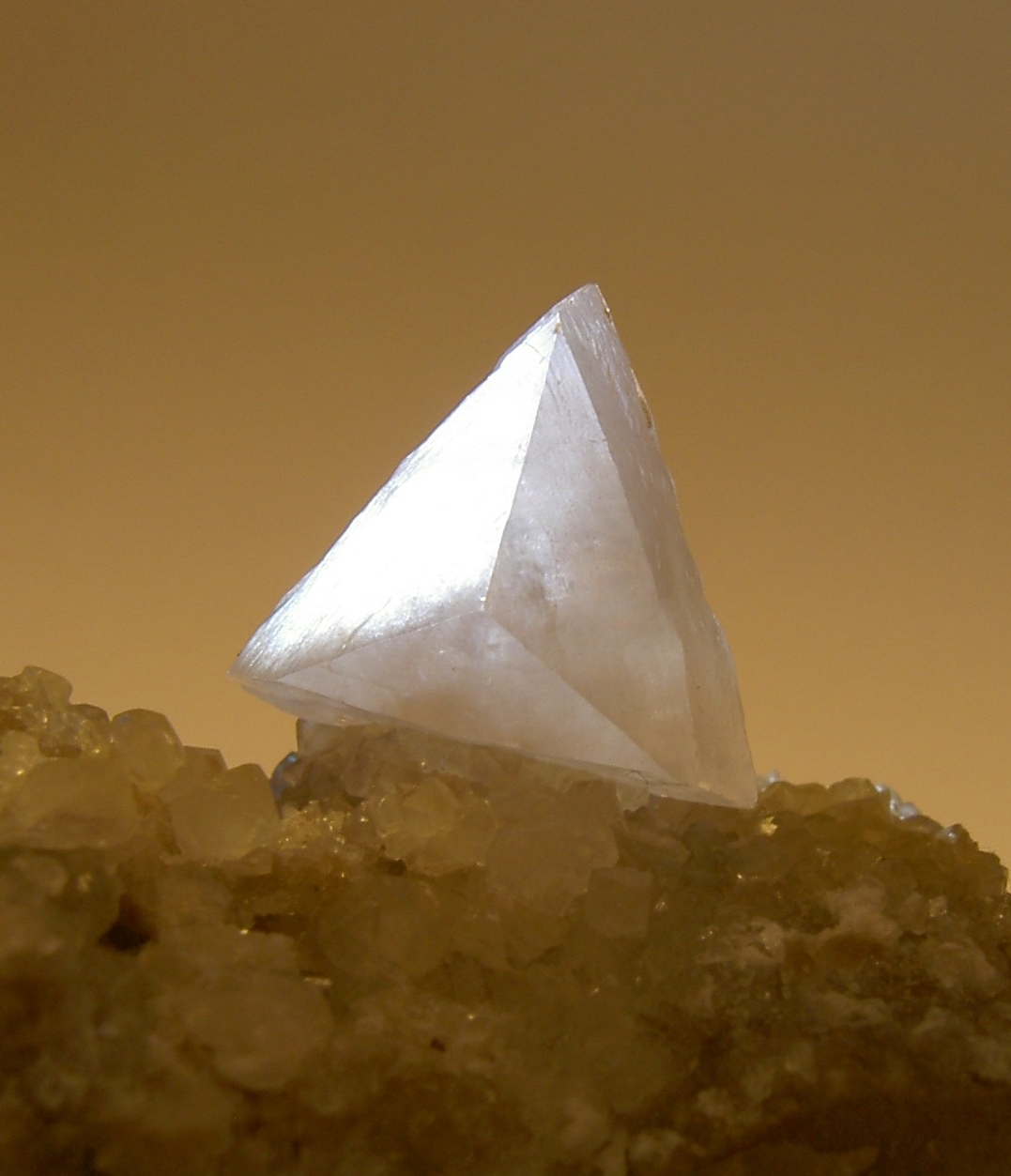
Bipyramidal calcite

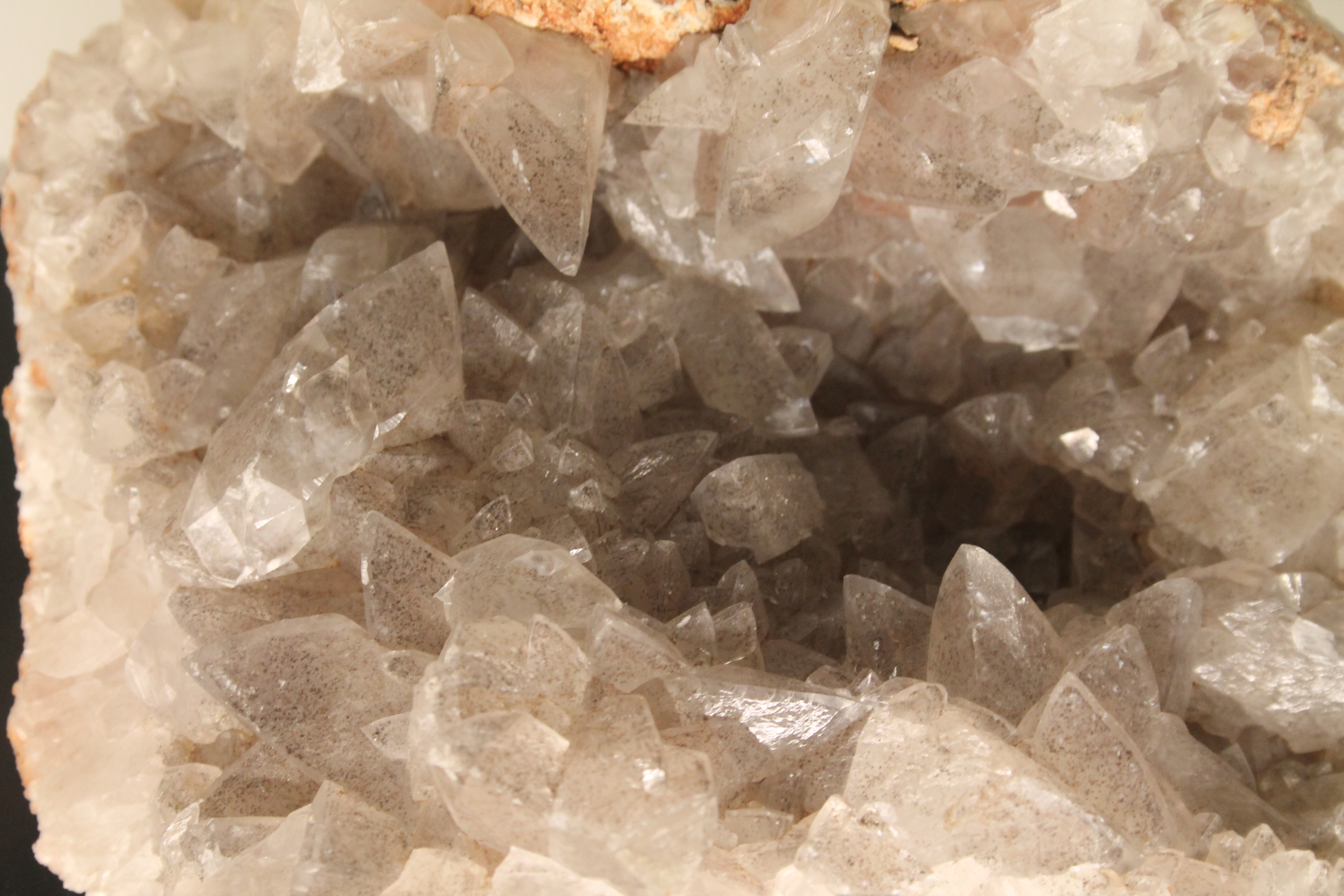
Druse calcite

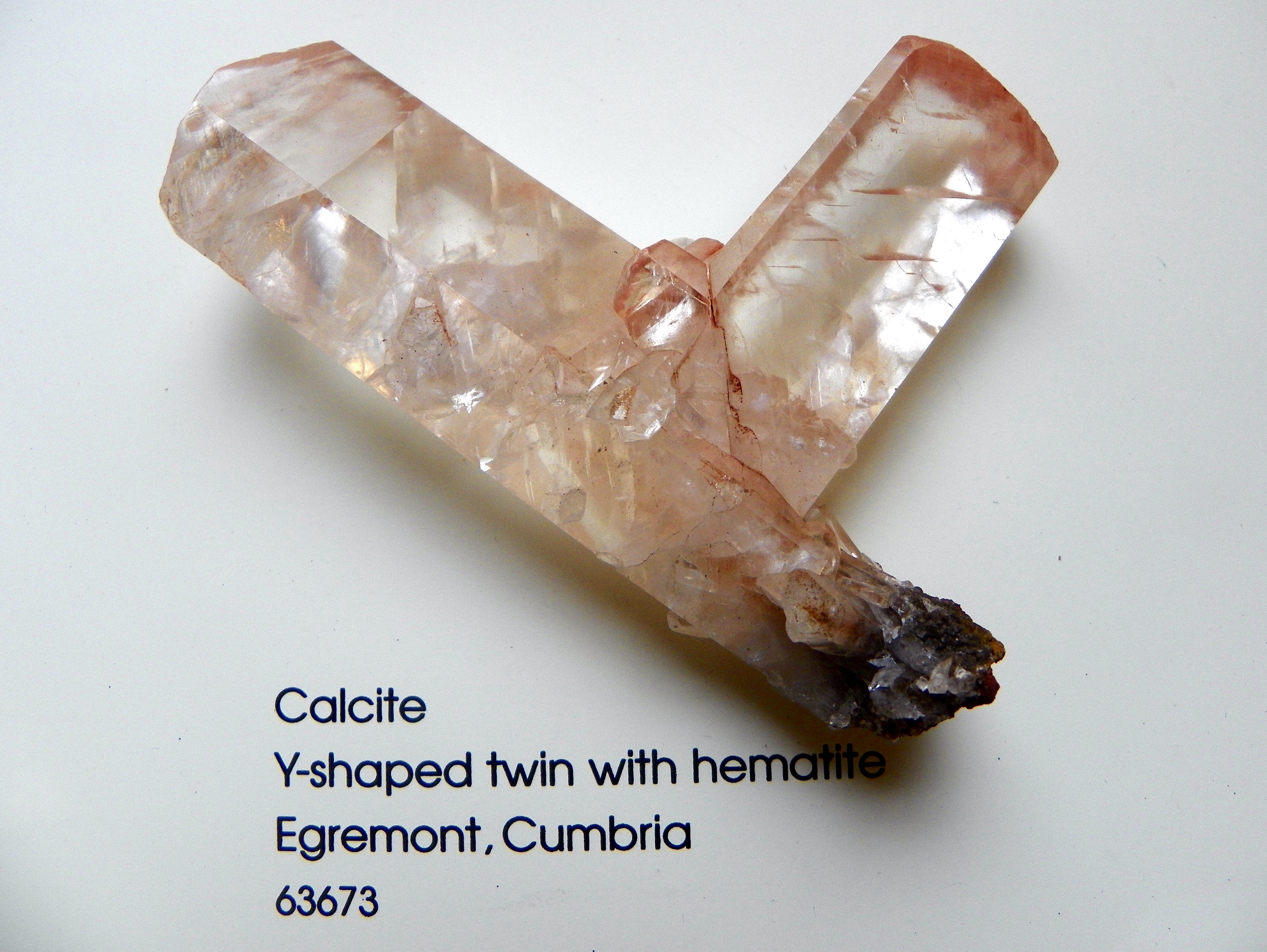
Twinned calcite

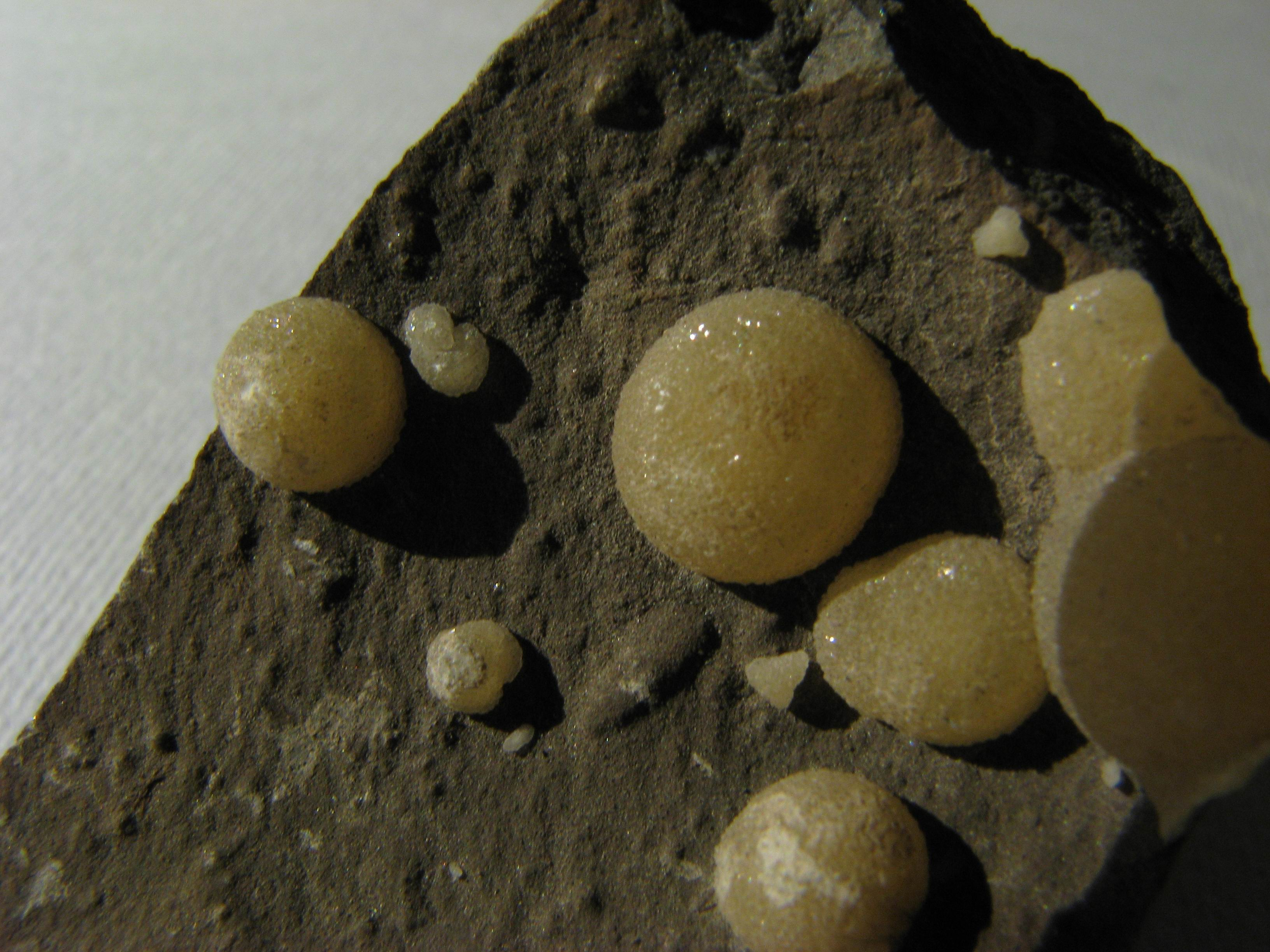
Globular calcite

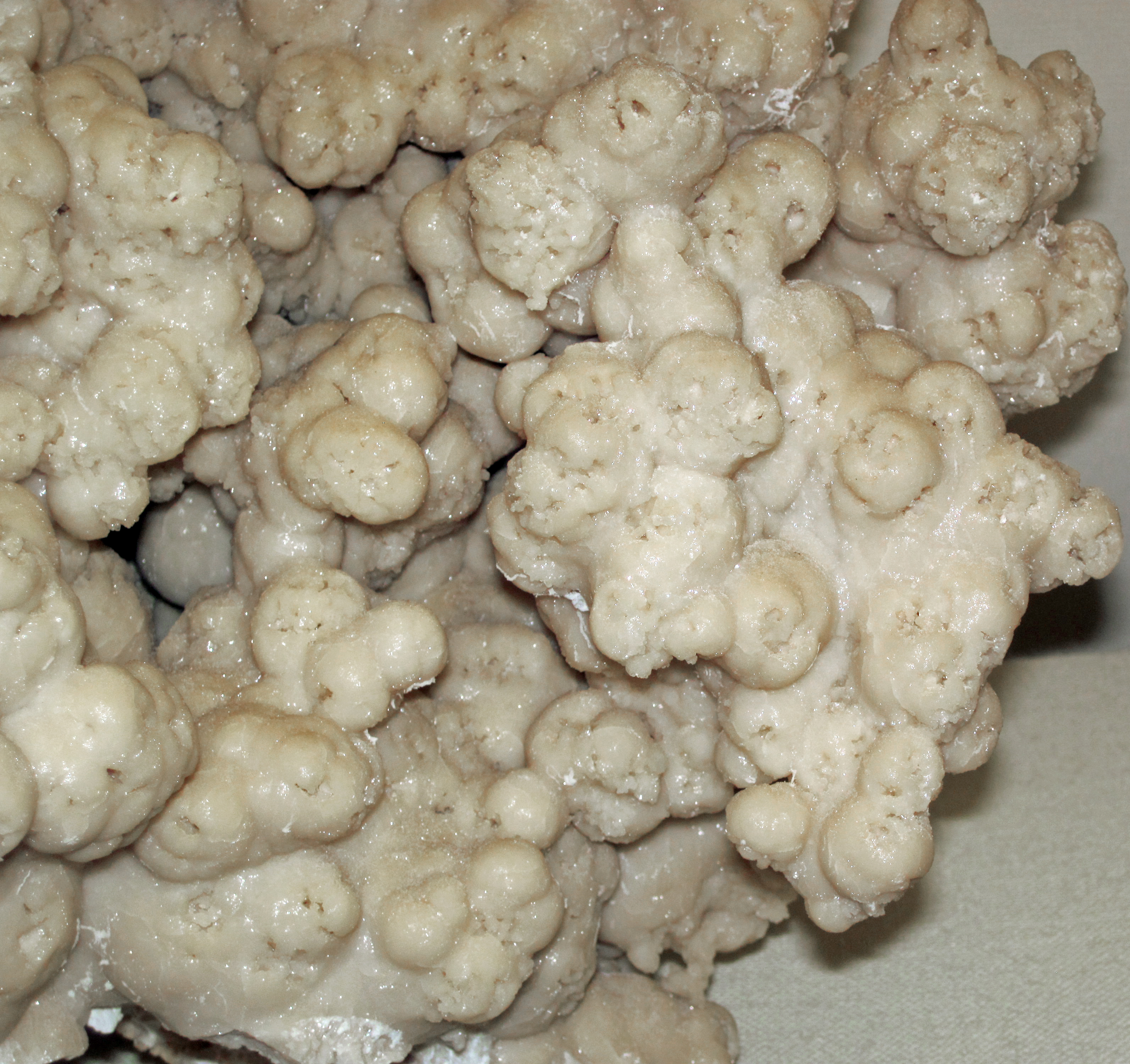
Botryoidal calcite

=== Optical ===
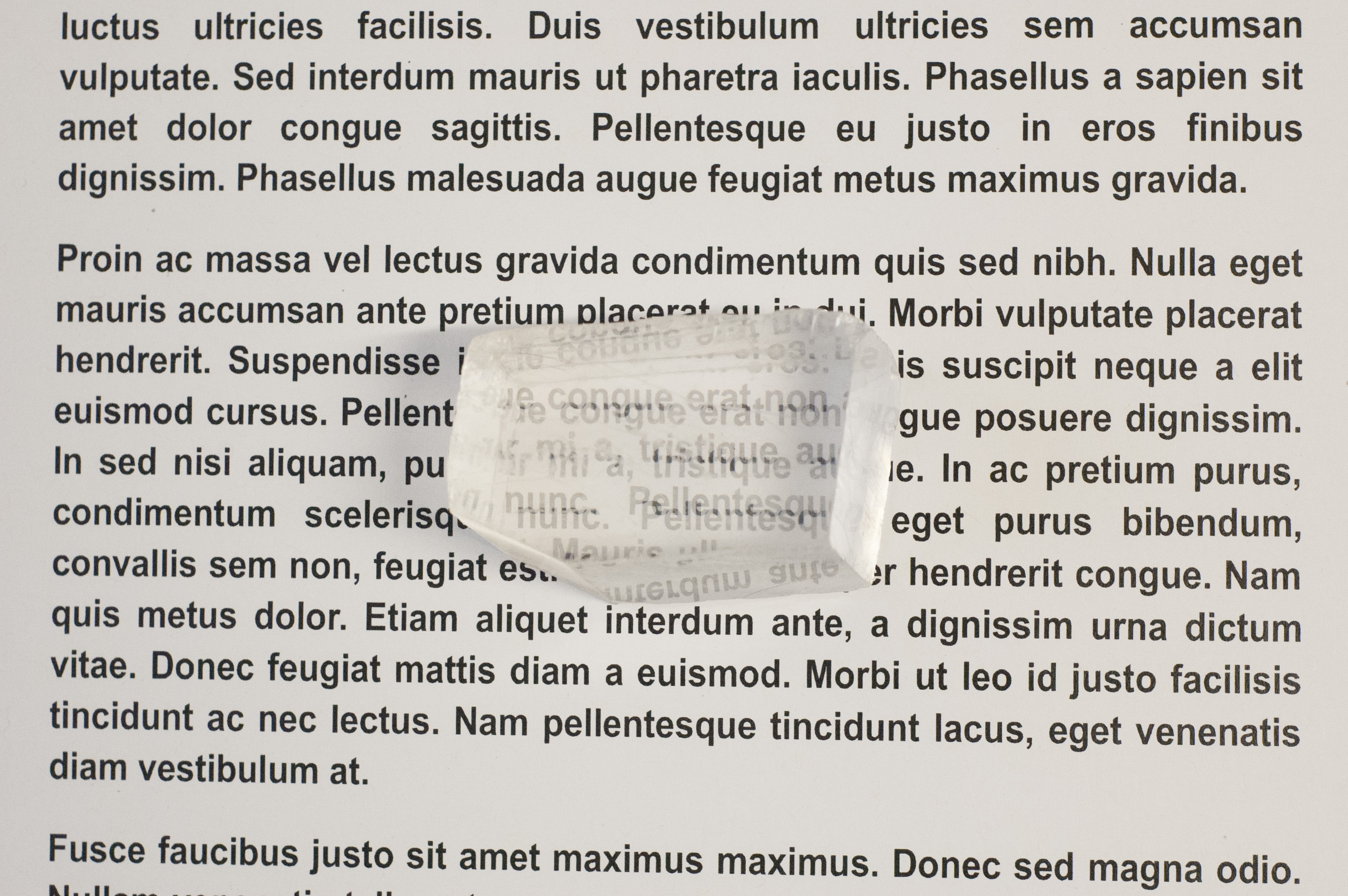
Calcite displaying the characteristic birefringence optical behaviour

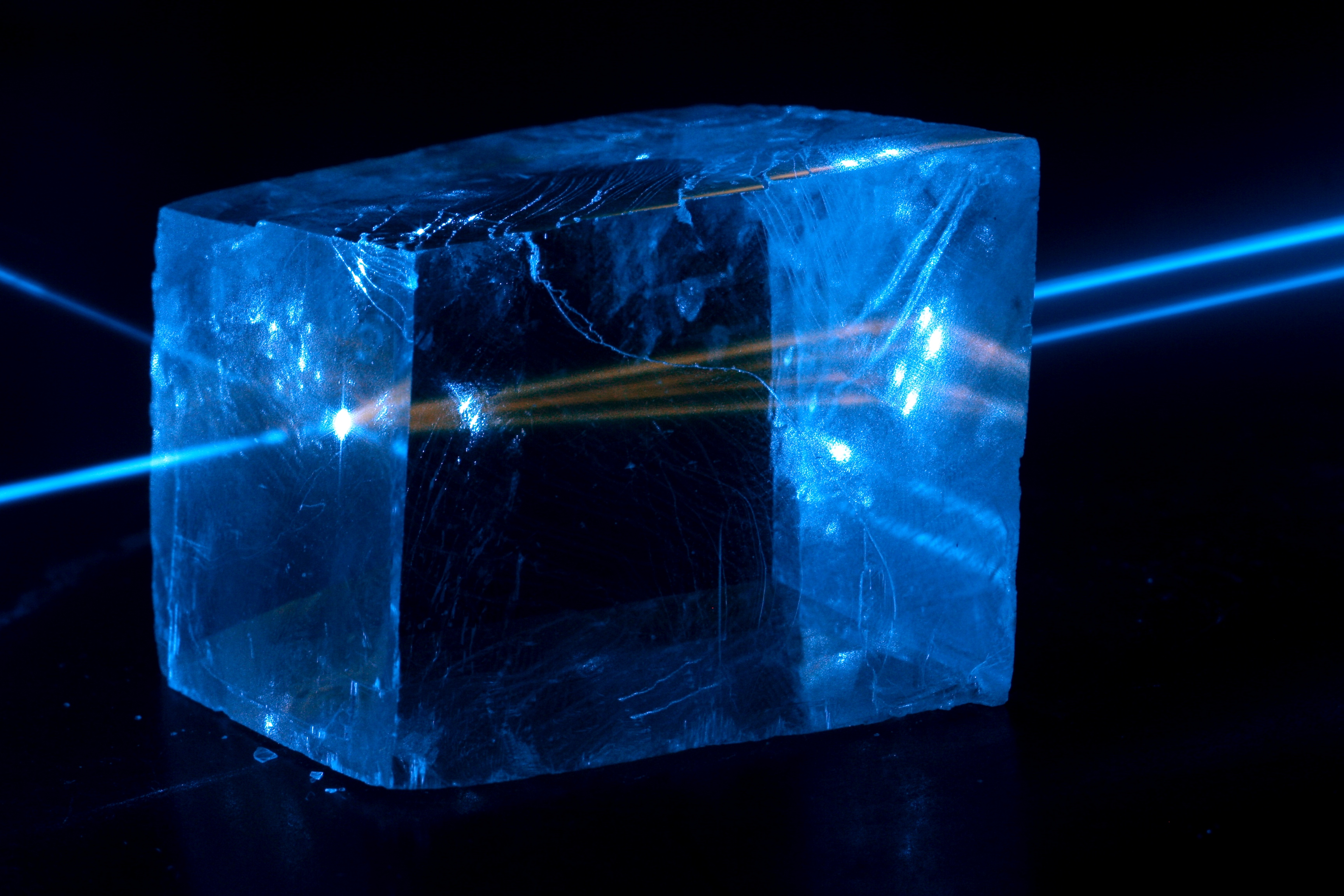
Demonstration of birefringence in calcite, using 445 nm laser

Calcite is transparent to opaque and may occasionally show phosphorescence or fluorescence. A transparent variety called "Iceland spar" is used for optical purposes. Acute scalenohedral crystals are sometimes referred to as "dogtooth spar" while the rhombohedral form is sometimes referred to as "nailhead spar". The rhombohedral form may also have been the "sunstone" whose use by Viking navigators is mentioned in the Icelandic Sagas.

Single calcite crystals display an optical property called birefringence (double refraction). This strong birefringence causes objects viewed through a clear piece of calcite to appear doubled. The birefringent effect (using calcite) was first described by the Danish scientist Rasmus Bartholin in 1669. At a wavelength of about 590 nm, calcite has ordinary and extraordinary refractive indices of 1.658 and 1.486, respectively. Between 190 and 1700 nm, the ordinary refractive index varies roughly between 1.9 and 1.5, while the extraordinary refractive index varies between 1.6 and 1.4.

=== Thermoluminescence ===
Calcite has thermoluminescent properties mainly due to the presence of divalent manganese (Mn^{2+}) impurities. An experiment was conducted by adding activators such as ions of manganese, iron, cobalt, nickel, copper, zinc, silver, lead, and bismuth to the calcite samples to observe whether they emitted heat or light. The results showed that adding ions (Cu^{+}, Cu^{2+}, Zn^{2+}, Ag^{+}, Bi^{3+}, Fe^{2+}, Fe^{3+}, Co^{2+}, Ni^{2+}) did not react. However, a reaction occurred when both manganese and lead ions were present in calcite. By changing the temperature and observing the glow curve peaks, it was found that Pb^{2+} and Mn^{2+}acted as activators in the calcite lattice, but Pb^{2+} was much less efficient than Mn^{2+}.

Measuring mineral thermoluminescence experiments usually use x-rays or gamma rays to activate the sample and record the changes in glowing curves at a temperature of 700–7500 K. Mineral thermoluminescence can form various glow curves of crystals under different conditions, such as temperature changes, because impurity ions or other crystal defects present in minerals supply luminescence centers and trapping levels. Observing these curve changes also can help infer geological correlation and age determination.

=== Chemical ===
Calcite, like most carbonates, dissolves in acids by the following reaction:

CaCO_{3} + 2 H^{+} → Ca^{2+} + H_{2}O + CO_{2}

The carbon dioxide released by this reaction produces a characteristic effervescence when a calcite sample is treated with an acid.

Due to its acidity, carbon dioxide has a slight solubilizing effect on calcite. The overall reaction is:

CaCO_{3}(s) + H_{2}O + CO_{2}(aq) → Ca^{2+}(aq) + 2HCO^{−}_{3}(aq)

If the amount of dissolved carbon dioxide drops, the reaction reverses to precipitate calcite. As a result, calcite can be either dissolved by groundwater or precipitated by groundwater, depending on such factors as the water temperature, pH, and dissolved ion concentrations. When conditions are right for precipitation, calcite forms mineral coatings that cement rock grains together and can fill fractures. When conditions are right for dissolution, the removal of calcite can dramatically increase the porosity and permeability of the rock, and if it continues for a long period of time, may result in the formation of caves. Continued dissolution of calcium carbonate-rich formations can lead to the expansion and eventual collapse of cave systems, resulting in various forms of karst topography.

Calcite exhibits an unusual characteristic called retrograde solubility: it is less soluble in water as the temperature increases. Calcite is also more soluble at higher pressures.

Pure calcite has the composition CaCO_{3}. However, the calcite in limestone often contains a few percent of magnesium. Calcite in limestone is divided into low-magnesium and high-magnesium calcite, with the dividing line placed at a composition of 4% magnesium. High-magnesium calcite retains the calcite mineral structure, which is distinct from that of dolomite, MgCa(CO_{3})_{2}. Calcite can also contain small quantities of iron and manganese. Manganese may be responsible for the fluorescence of impure calcite, as may traces of organic compounds.

== Distribution ==
Calcite is found all over the world, and its leading global distribution is as follows:

=== United States ===
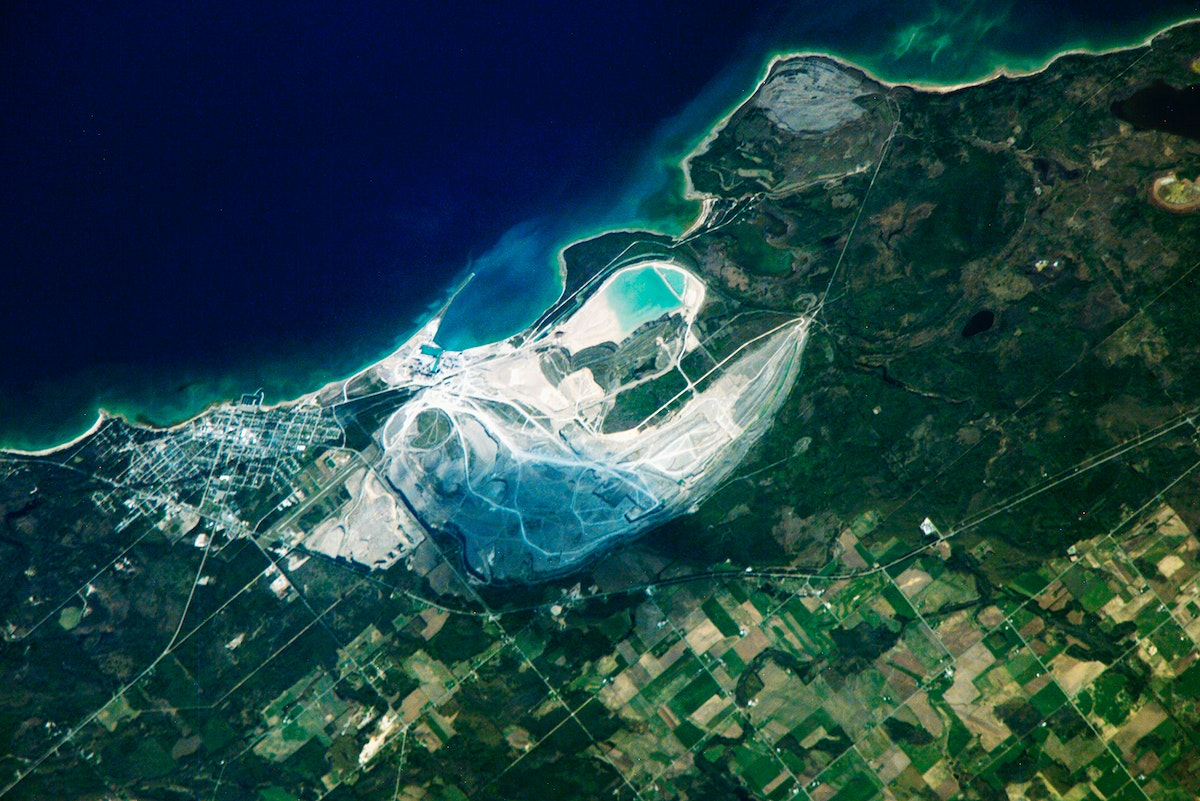
Calcite Quarry, Michigan.

Calcite is found in many different areas in the United States. One of the best examples is the Calcite Quarry in Michigan. The Calcite Quarry is the largest carbonate mine in the world and has been in use for more than 85 years. Large quantities of calcite can be mined from these sizeable open pit mines.

=== Canada ===
Calcite can also be found throughout Canada, such as in Thorold Quarry and Madawaska Mine, Ontario, Canada.

=== Mexico ===
Abundant calcite is mined in the Santa Eulalia mining district, Chihuahua, Mexico.

=== Iceland ===
Large quantities of calcite in Iceland are concentrated in the Helgustadir mine. The mine was once the primary mining location of "Iceland spar". However, it currently serves as a nature reserve, and calcite mining is no longer allowed.

=== England ===
Calcite is found in parts of England, such as Alston Moor, Egremont, and Frizington, Cumbria.

=== Germany ===
There are calcite deposits in Sankt Andreasberg in the Harz, and near Freiberg, Saxony.

== Use and applications ==
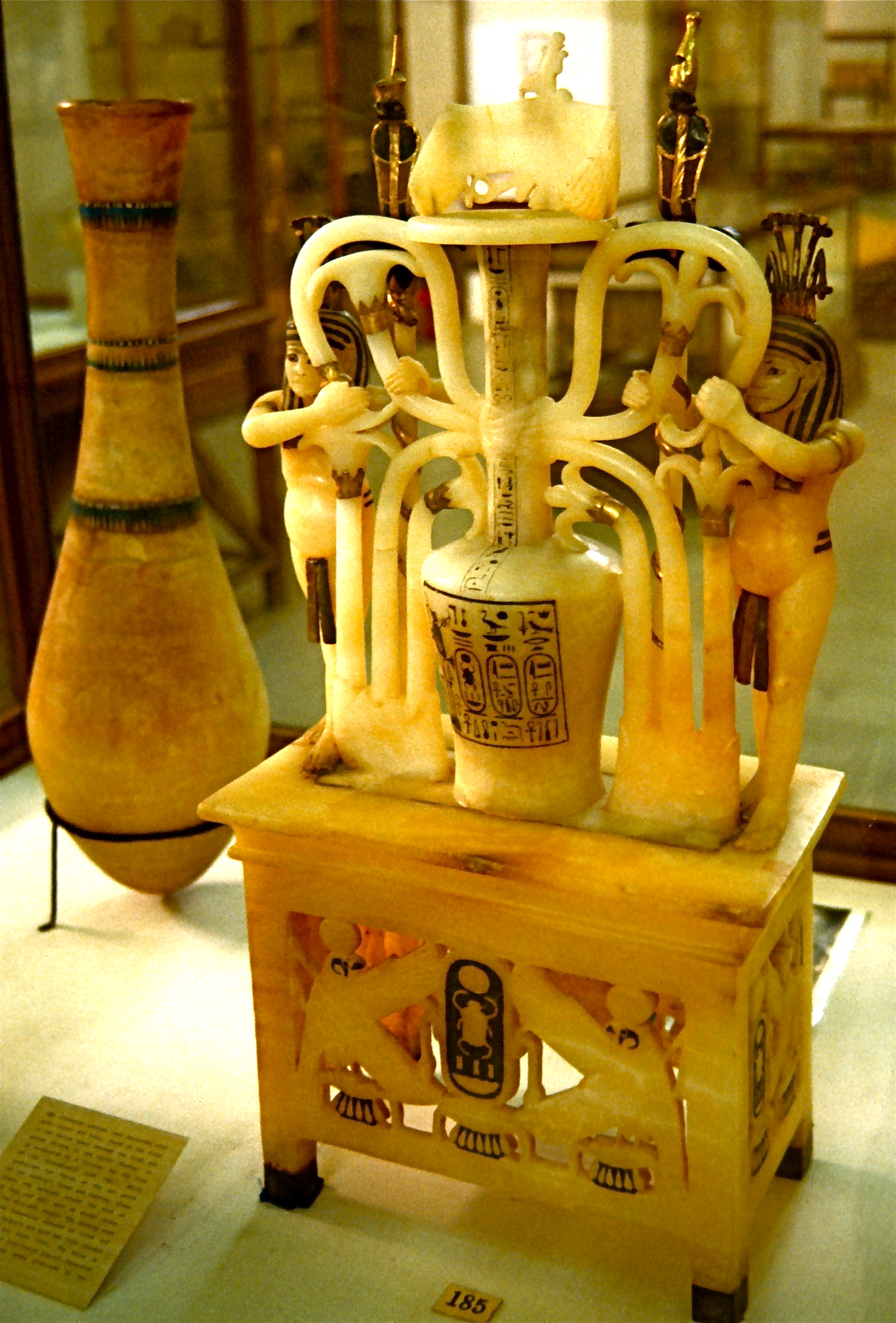
One of several calcite or alabaster perfume jars from the tomb of Tutankhamun, d. 1323 BC

Ancient Egyptians carved many items out of calcite, relating it to their goddess Bast, whose name contributed to the term alabaster because of the close association. Many other cultures have used the material for similar carved objects and applications.

A transparent variety of calcite known as Iceland spar may have been used by Vikings for navigating on cloudy days. A very pure crystal of calcite can split a beam of sunlight into dual images, as the polarized light deviates slightly from the main beam. By observing the sky through the crystal and then rotating it so that the two images are of equal brightness, the rings of polarized light that surround the sun can be seen even under overcast skies. Identifying the sun's location would give seafarers a reference point for navigating on their lengthy sea voyages.

In World War II, high-grade optical calcite was used for gun sights, specifically in bomb sights and anti-aircraft weaponry. It was used as a polarizer (in Nicol prisms) before the invention of Polaroid plates and still finds use in optical instruments. Also, experiments have been conducted to use calcite for a cloak of invisibility.

Microbiologically precipitated calcite has a wide range of applications, such as soil remediation, soil stabilization and concrete repair. It also can be used for tailings management and is designed to promote sustainable development in the mining industry.

Calcite can help synthesize precipitated calcium carbonate (PCC) (mainly used in the paper industry) and increase carbonation. Furthermore, due to its particular crystal habit, such as rhombohedron, hexagonal prism, etc., it promotes the production of PCC with specific shapes and particle sizes.

Calcite, obtained from an 80 kg sample of Carrara marble, is used as the IAEA-603 isotopic standard in mass spectrometry for the calibration of δ^{18}O and δ^{13}C.

Calcite can be formed naturally or synthesized. However, artificial calcite is the preferred material to be used as a scaffold in bone tissue engineering due to its controllable and repeatable properties.

Calcite can be used to alleviate water pollution caused by the excessive growth of cyanobacteria. Lakes and rivers can lead to cyanobacteria blooms due to eutrophication, which pollutes water resources. Phosphorus (P) is the leading cause of excessive growth of cyanobacteria. As an active capping material, calcite can help reduce P release from sediments into the water, thus inhibiting cyanobacteria overgrowth.

In traditional Chinese medicine, calcite, also known as calcitum, is believed to have cooling properties and is used to counteract shanghuo, or "heatiness".

== Natural occurrence ==
Calcite is a common constituent of sedimentary rocks, limestone in particular, much of which is formed from the shells of dead marine organisms. Approximately 10% of sedimentary rock is limestone. It is the primary mineral in metamorphic marble. It also occurs in deposits from hot springs as a vein mineral; in caverns as stalactites and stalagmites; and in volcanic or mantle-derived rocks such as carbonatites, kimberlites, or rarely in peridotites.

Cacti contain Ca-oxalate biominerals. Their death releases these biominerals into the environment, which subsequently transform to calcite via a monohydrocalcite intermediate, sequestering carbon.

Calcite is often the primary constituent of the shells of marine organisms, such as plankton (such as coccoliths and planktic foraminifera), the hard parts of red algae, some sponges, brachiopods, echinoderms, some serpulids, most bryozoa, and parts of the shells of some bivalves (such as oysters and rudists). Calcite is found in spectacular form in the Snowy River Cave of New Mexico as mentioned above, where microorganisms are credited with natural formations. Trilobites, which became extinct a quarter billion years ago, had unique compound eyes that used clear calcite crystals to form the lenses. It also forms a substantial part of birds' eggshells, and the δ^{13}C of the diet is reflected in the δ^{13}C of the calcite of the shell.

The largest documented single crystal of calcite originated from Iceland, measured 7 m × 7 m × 2 m (23 ft × 23 ft × 6.6 ft) and 6 m × 6 m × 3 m (20 ft × 20 ft × 9.8 ft) and weighed about 250 tons. Classic samples have been produced at Madawaska Mine, near Bancroft, Ontario.

Bedding parallel veins of fibrous calcite, often referred to in quarrying parlance as beef, occur in dark organic rich mudstones and shales, these veins are formed by increasing fluid pressure during diagenesis.

== Formation processes ==
Phase diagram for calcium carbonate metamorphosis between aragonite and calcite

Calcite formation can proceed by several pathways, from the classical terrace ledge kink model to the crystallization of poorly ordered precursor phases like amorphous calcium carbonate (ACC) via an Ostwald ripening process, or via the agglomeration of nanocrystals.

The crystallization of ACC can occur in two stages. First, the ACC nanoparticles rapidly dehydrate and crystallize to form individual particles of vaterite. Second, the vaterite transforms to calcite via a dissolution and reprecipitation mechanism, with the reaction rate controlled by the surface area of a calcite crystal. The second stage of the reaction is approximately 10 times slower.

However, crystallization of calcite has been observed to be dependent on the starting pH and concentration of magnesium in solution. A neutral starting pH during mixing promotes the direct transformation of ACC into calcite without a vaterite intermediate. But when ACC forms in a solution with a basic initial pH, the transformation to calcite occurs via metastable vaterite, following the pathway outlined above. Magnesium has a noteworthy effect on both the stability of ACC and its transformation to crystalline CaCO_{3}, resulting in the formation of calcite directly from ACC, as this ion destabilizes the structure of vaterite.

Epitaxial overgrowths of calcite precipitated on weathered cleavage surfaces have morphologies that vary with the type of weathering the substrate experienced: growth on physically weathered surfaces has a shingled morphology due to Volmer-Weber growth, growth on chemically weathered surfaces has characteristics of Stranski–Krastanov growth, and growth on pristine cleavage surfaces has characteristics of Frank–van der Merwe growth. These differences are apparently due to the influence of surface roughness on layer coalescence dynamics.

Calcite may form in the subsurface in response to microorganism activity, such as sulfate-dependent anaerobic oxidation of methane, where methane is oxidized and sulfate is reduced, leading to precipitation of calcite and pyrite from the produced bicarbonate and sulfide. These processes can be traced by the specific carbon isotope composition of the calcites, which are extremely depleted in the ^{13}C isotope, by as much as −125 per mil PDB (δ^{13}C).

== In Earth history ==
Calcite seas existed in Earth's history when the primary inorganic precipitate of calcium carbonate in marine waters was low-magnesium calcite (lmc), as opposed to the aragonite and high-magnesium calcite (hmc) precipitated today. Calcite seas alternated with aragonite seas over the Phanerozoic, being most prominent in the Ordovician and Jurassic periods. Lineages evolved to use whichever morph of calcium carbonate was favourable in the ocean at the time they became mineralised, and retained this mineralogy for the remainder of their evolutionary history. Petrographic evidence for these calcite sea conditions consists of calcitic ooids, lmc cements, hardgrounds, and rapid early seafloor aragonite dissolution. The evolution of marine organisms with calcium carbonate shells may have been affected by the calcite and aragonite sea cycle.

Calcite is one of the minerals that has been shown to catalyze an important biological reaction, the formose reaction, and may have had a role in the origin of life. Interaction of its chiral surfaces (see Form) with aspartic acid molecules results in a slight bias in chirality; this is one possible mechanism for the origin of homochirality in living cells.

== Climate change ==
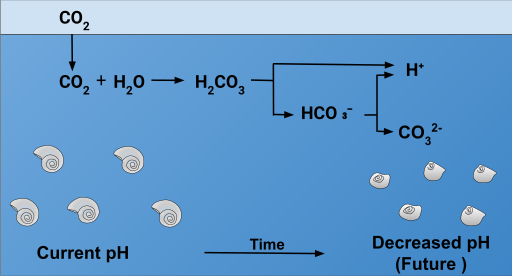
Ocean acidification reduces pH, which affects calcification in shelled organisms.

Climate change is exacerbating ocean acidification, possibly leading to lower natural calcite production. The oceans absorb large amounts of CO_{2} from fossil fuel emissions into the air. The total amount of artificial CO_{2} absorbed by the oceans is calculated to be 118 ± 19 Gt C. If a large amount of CO_{2} dissolves in the sea, it will cause the acidity of the seawater to increase, thereby affecting the pH value of the ocean. Calcifying organisms in the sea, such as molluscs foraminifera, crustaceans, echinoderms and corals, are susceptible to pH changes. Meanwhile, these calcifying organisms are also an essential source of calcite. As ocean acidification causes pH to drop, carbonate ion concentrations will decline, potentially reducing natural calcite production.

== Gallery ==
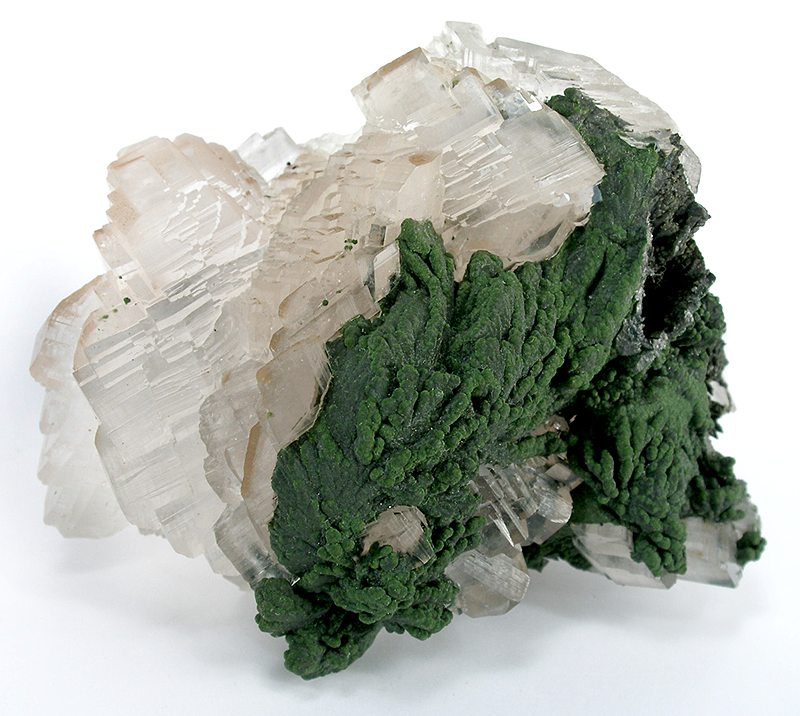
Calcite with mottramite

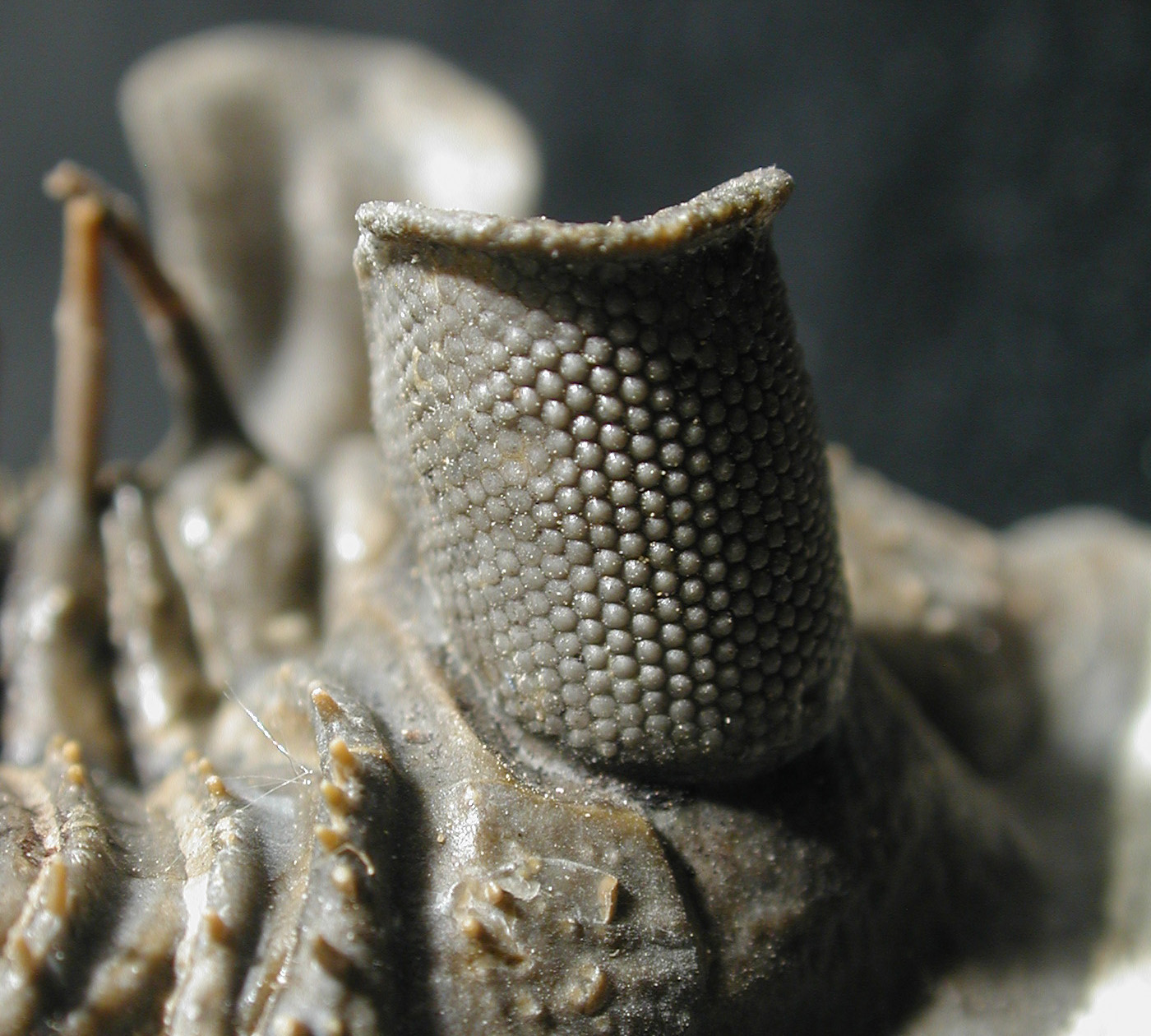
Trilobite eyes employed calcite

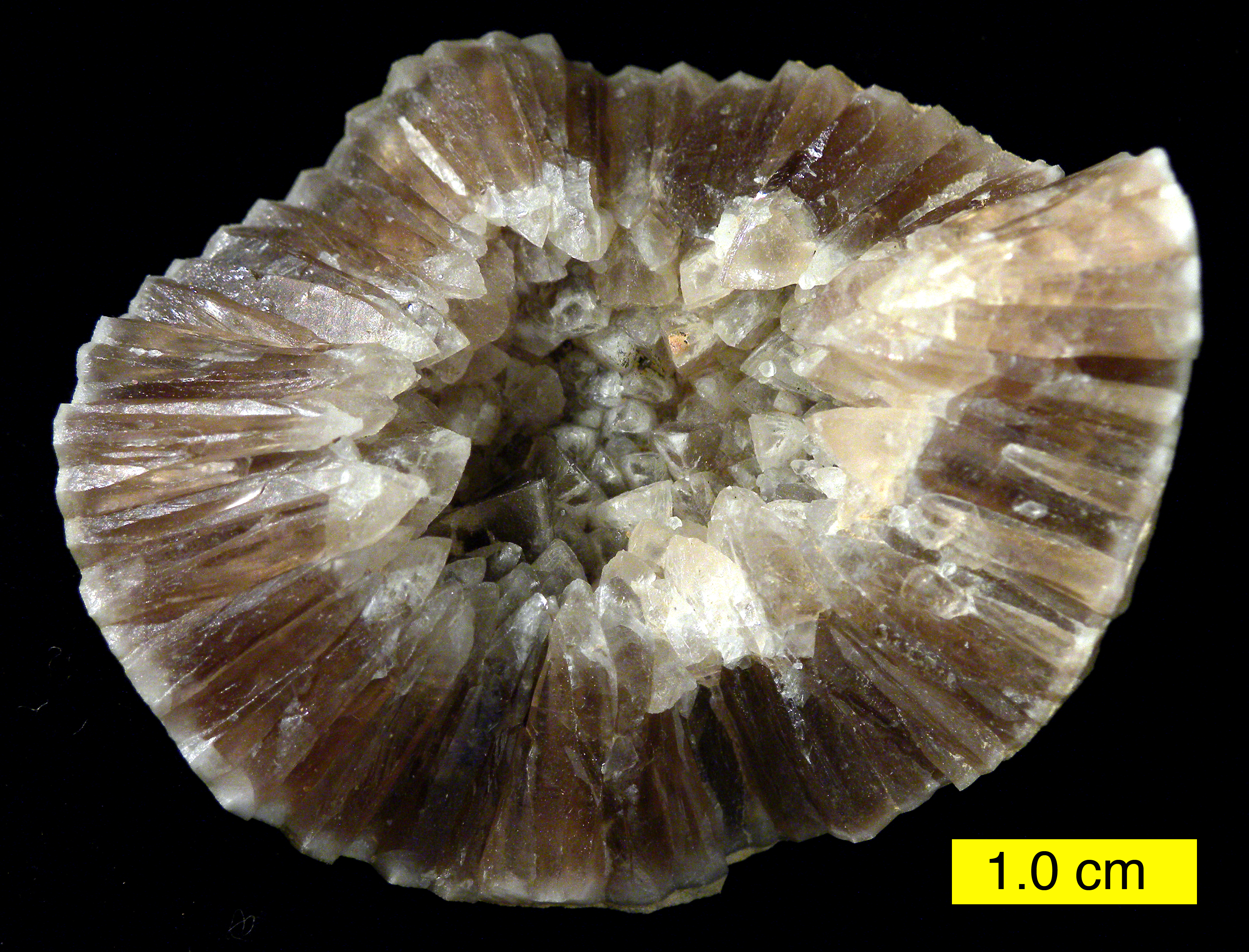
Calcite crystals inside a test of the cystoid Echinosphaerites aurantium (Middle Ordovician, northeastern Estonia)

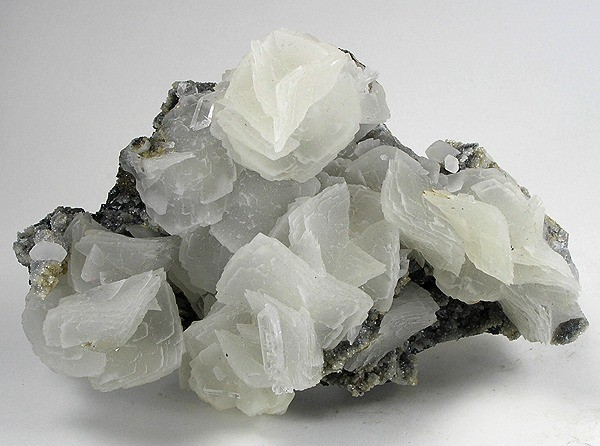
Rhombohedrons of calcite that appear almost as books of petals, piled up 3-dimensionally on the matrix

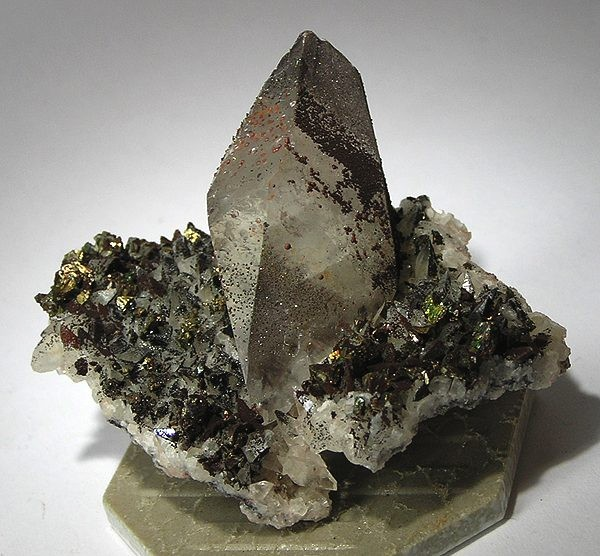
Calcite crystal canted at an angle, with little balls of hematite and crystals of chalcopyrite both on its surface and included just inside the surface of the crystal

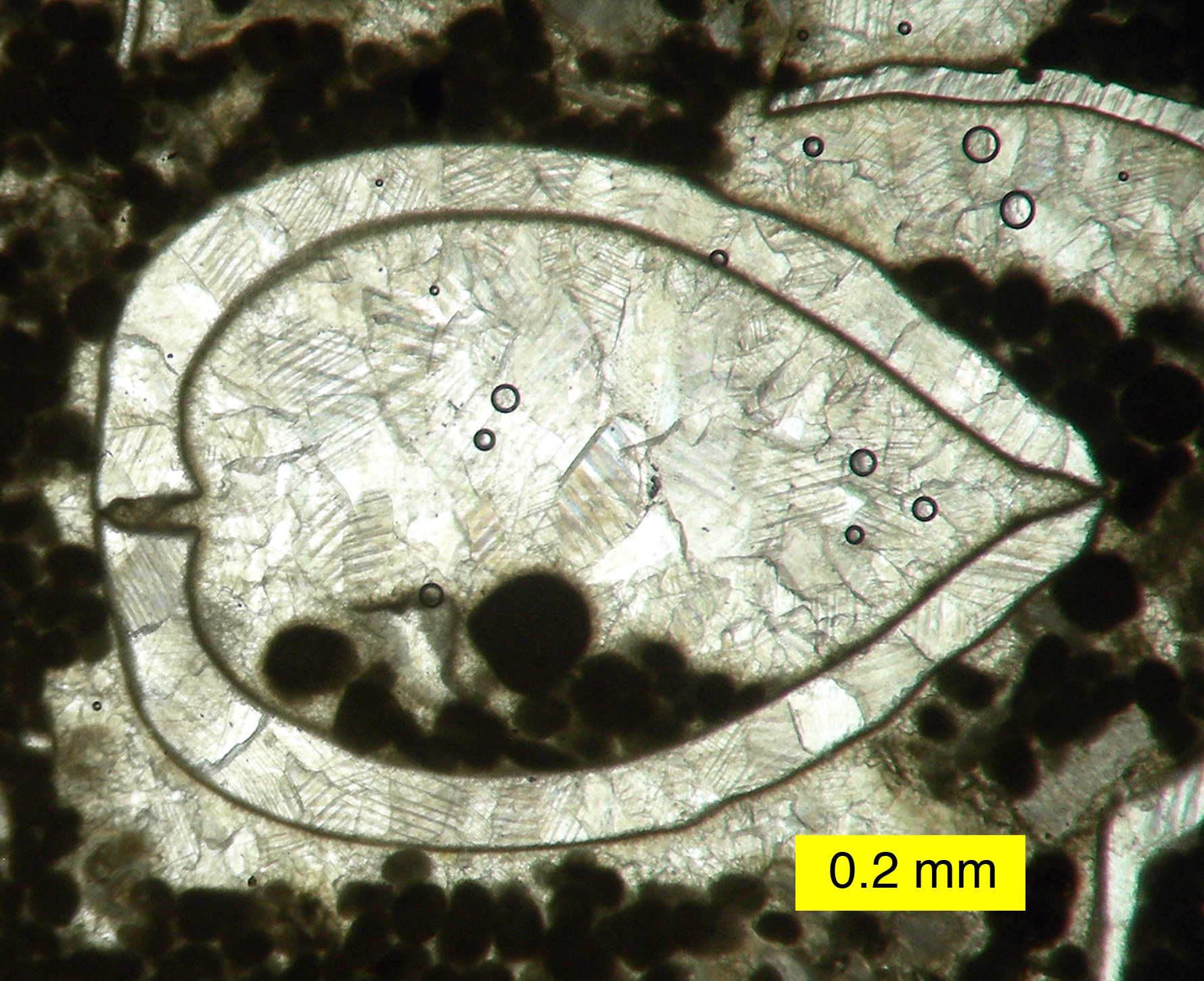
Thin section of calcite crystals inside a recrystallized bivalve shell in a biopelsparite

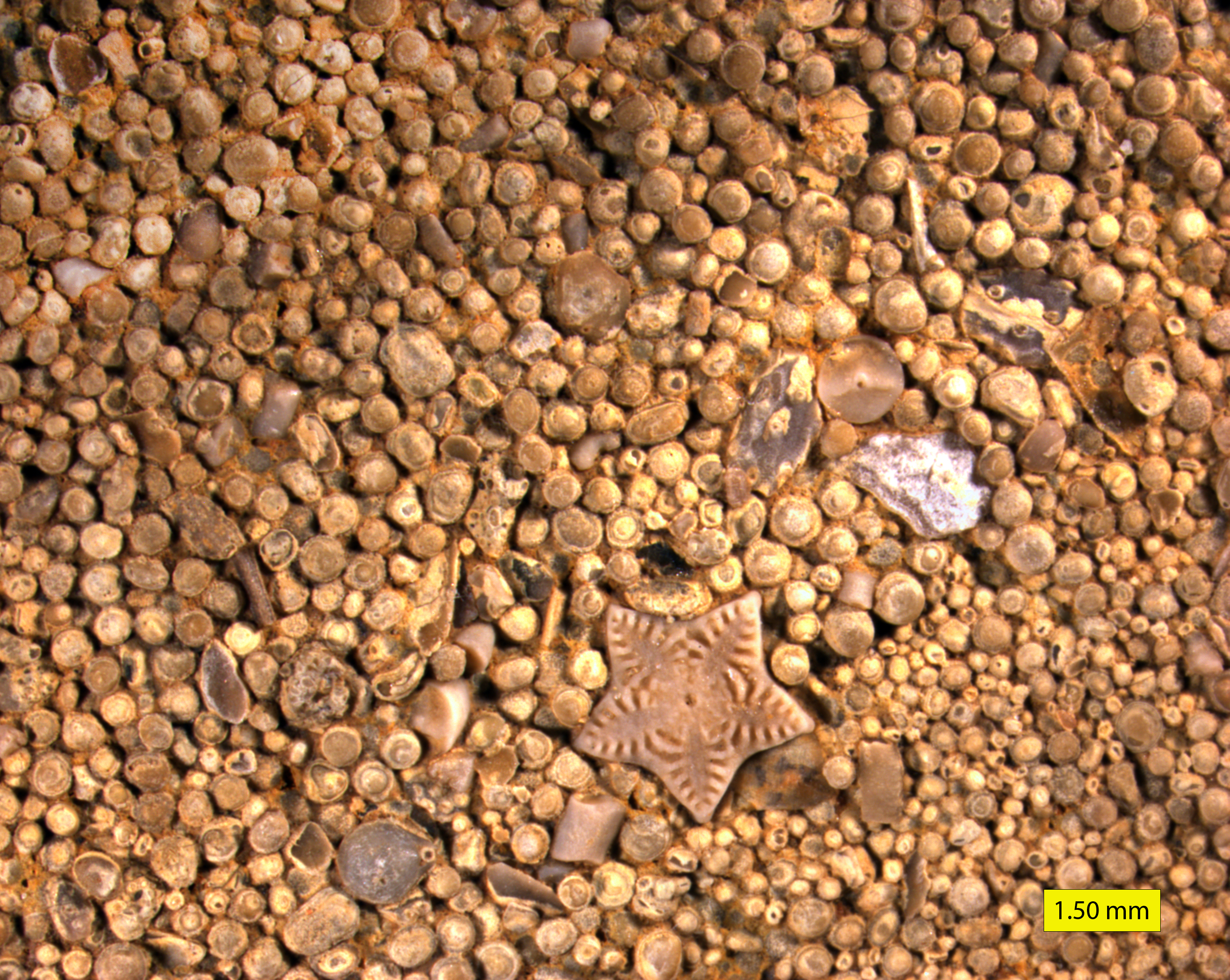
Grainstone with calcite ooids and sparry calcite cement; Carmel Formation, Middle Jurassic, of southern Utah, USA.

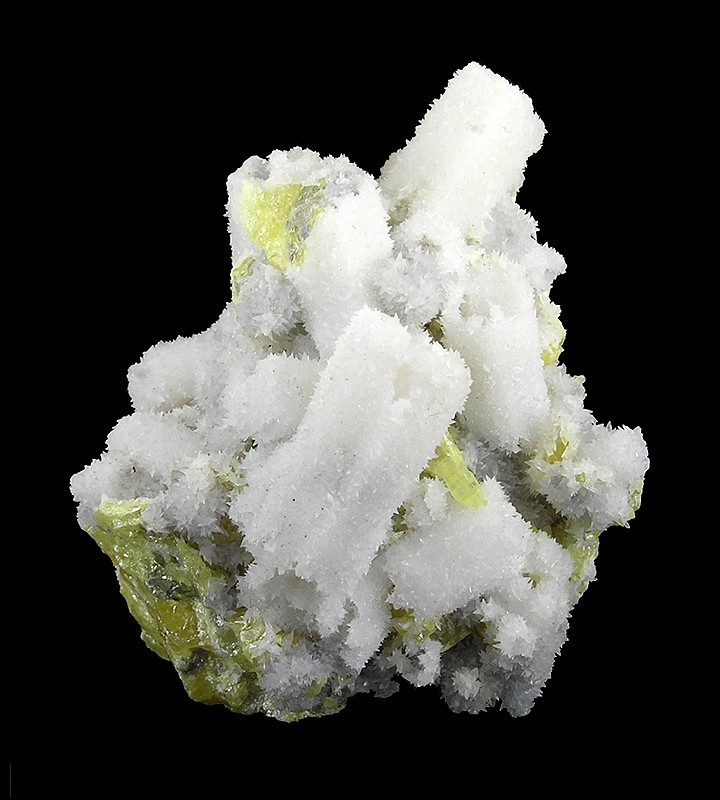
Several well formed milky white casts, made up of many small sharp calcite crystals, from the sulfur mines at Agrigento, Sicily

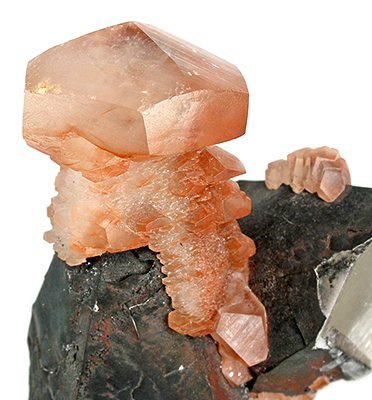
Reddish rhombohedral calcite crystals from China. Its red color is due to the presence of iron

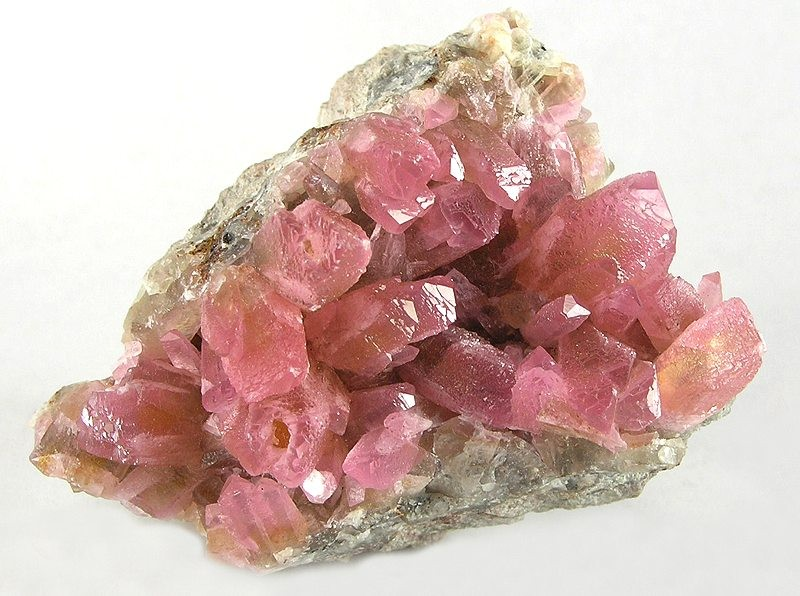
Cobaltoan, the cobalt-rich variety of calcite

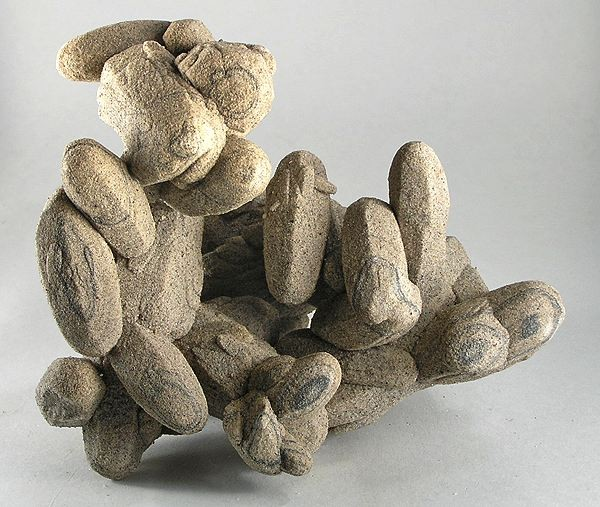
Sand calcites (calcites heavily included with desert sand) in South Dakota, USA

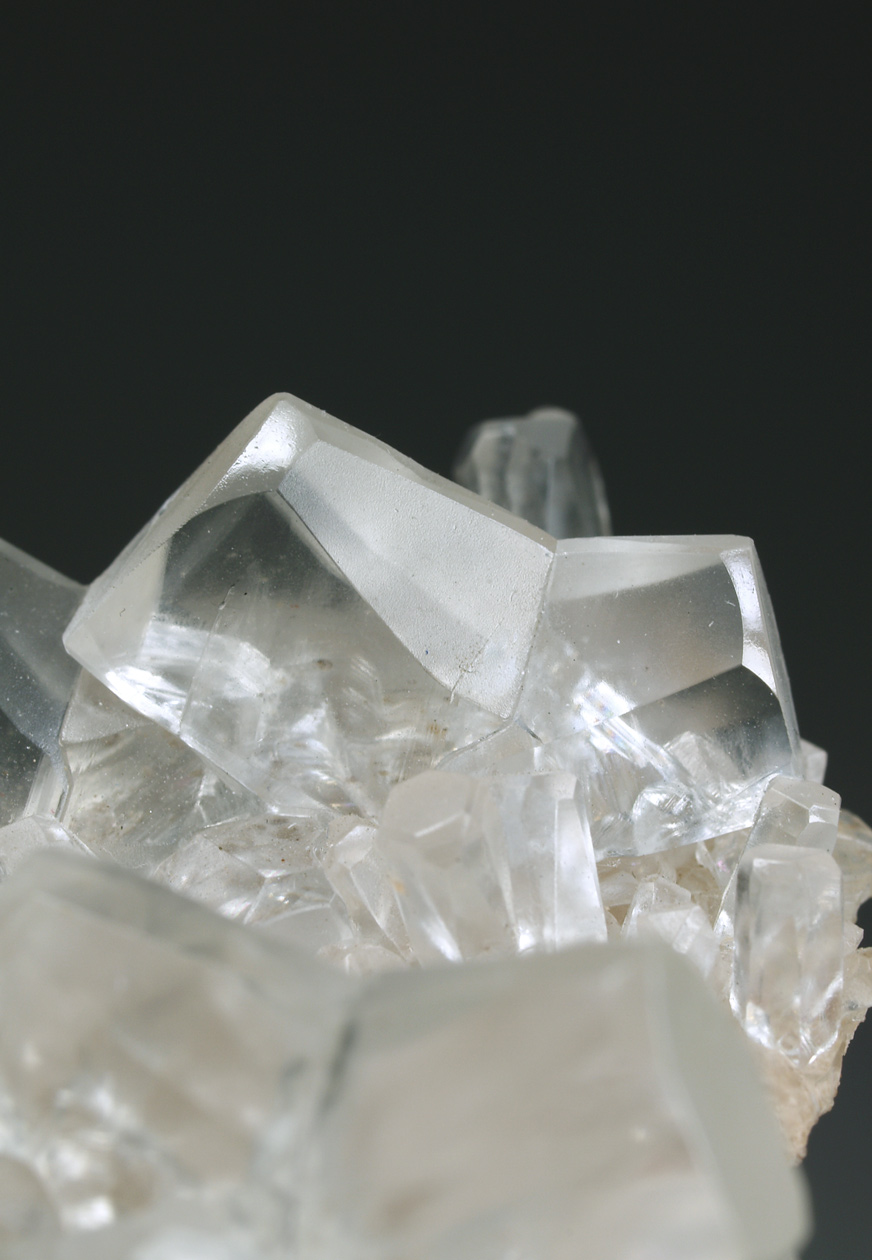
Calcite, butterfly twin, 4.0 × 3.3 × 1.6 cm. José María Patoni, San Juan del Río, Durango (Mexico)

== See also ==
- Carbonate rock
- Ikaite, CaCO_{3}·6H_{2}O
- List of minerals
- Lysocline
- Manganoan calcite, (Ca,Mn)CO_{3}
- Monohydrocalcite, CaCO_{3}·H_{2}O
- Nitratine
- Ocean acidification
- Ulexite
- Dolomitization
