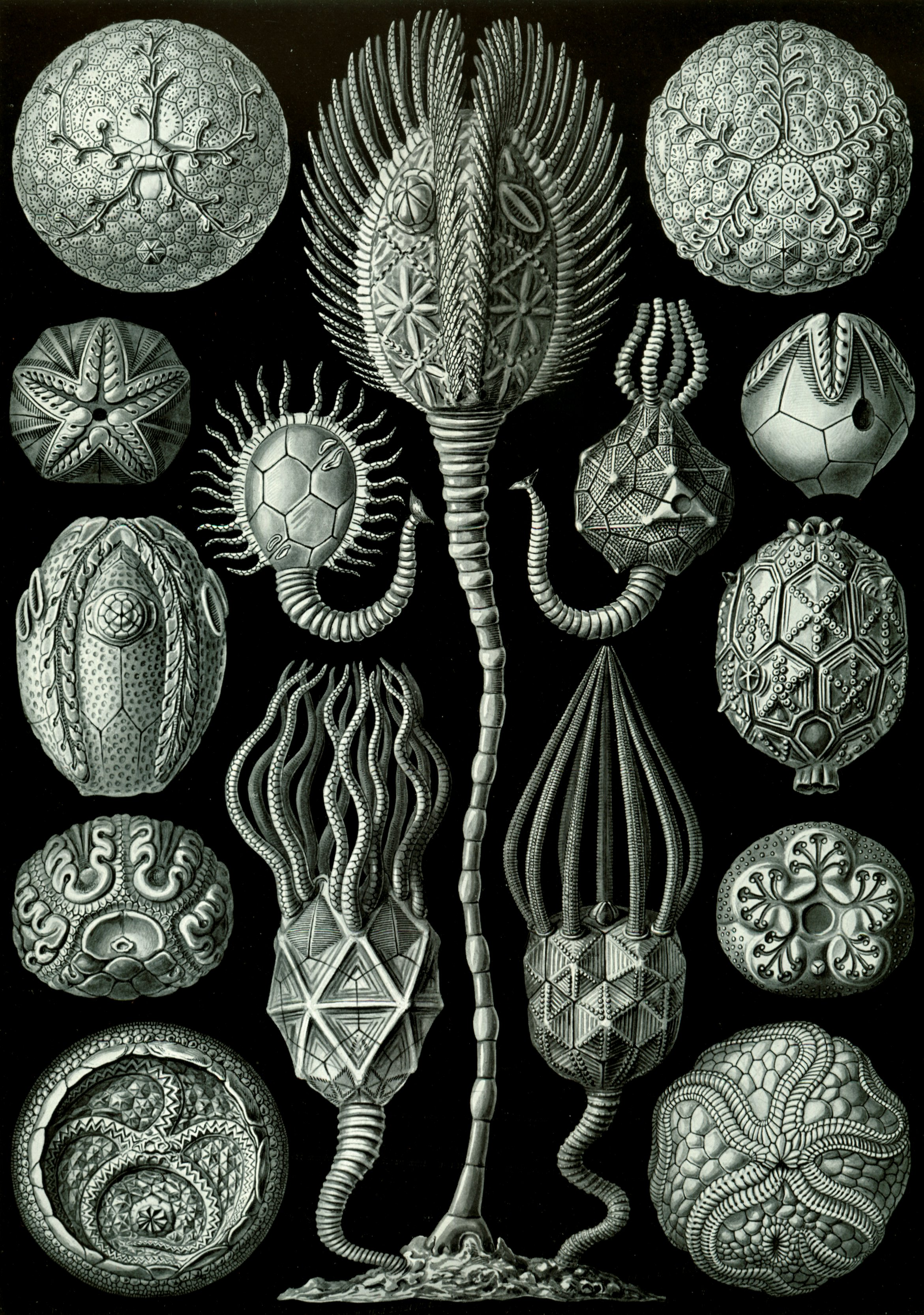
- "Cystoidea" from Ernst Haeckel's Kunstformen der Natur, 1904

Scientific classification
- Domain: Eukaryota
- Kingdom: Animalia
- Phylum: Echinodermata
- Subphylum: †Blastozoa
- Informal group: †Cystoidea von Buch 1846

Subdivisions
- Rhombifera Zittel 1879; Diploporita Múller 1854

= Cystoidea =

Cystoidea Temporal range: Middle Ordovician–Devonian

Class of extinct echinoderms

Cystoidea was defined as a class of extinct paleozoic blastozoan echinoderms established to encompass stalked taxa that were neither crinoids nor blastoids. It was shown to be polyphyletic in the late 1960s but continues to be used even in recent (as of 2022) literature to discuss both rhombiferans and diploporitans.

== History ==
The concept of Cystoidea has a complex history, with many emendations from its original conception. Early versions included the homalozoans, eocrinoids, paracrinoids, blastoids, and edrioblastoids. By 1967 the modern usage encompassing only rhombiferans and diploporitans had been established, although questions remained regarding the possible inclusion of blastoids. Despite these removals, speculation continued as to whether cystoids were ancestral to blastoids, crinoids, or echinoids.

Work published in 1967 and 1968 questioned whether Cystoidea formed a natural group, and in 1972 the former orders Rhombifera and Diploporita were elevated to class rank and Cystoidea was no longer used as a formal taxon. As an informal group, it encompasses those two former orders (which are no longer thought to be monophyletic either), but not the Blastoidea.

== Description ==
Cystoids have a theca featuring many plates, with distinctive pores. These pores are central to the identification of cystoids, and either sit on one plate (in diploporitans) or are shared by adjacent plates (in rhombiferans). These pores have a respiratory function.

The shape of the theca itself varies dramatically in shape, with some forms described as "rather bizarre." Some cystoids lost their stems as adults, or possibly do not have stems at all.

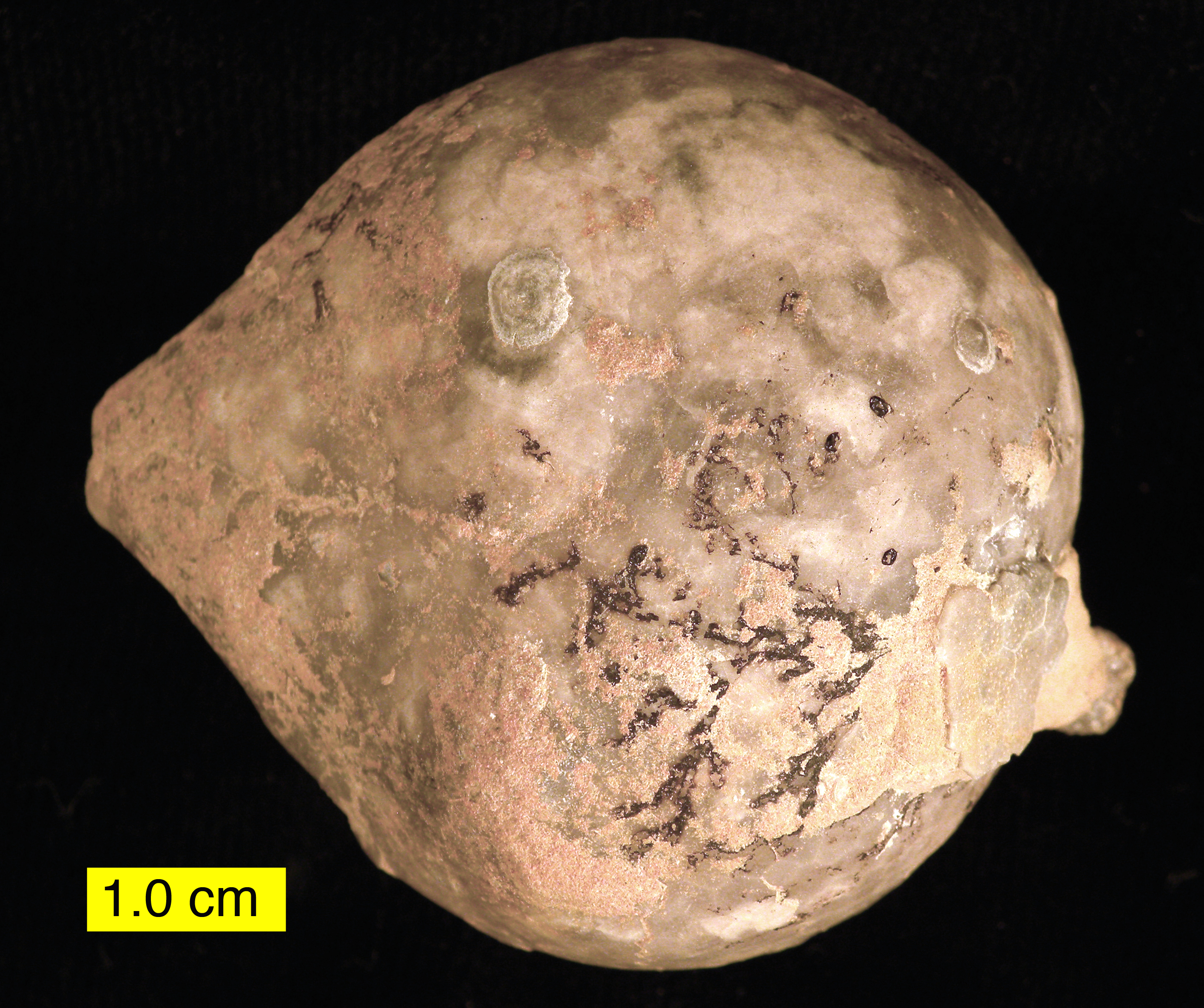
A Middle Ordovician rhombiferan cystoid Echinosphaerites aurantium (Estonia). It is encrusted by a graptolite (black branches).

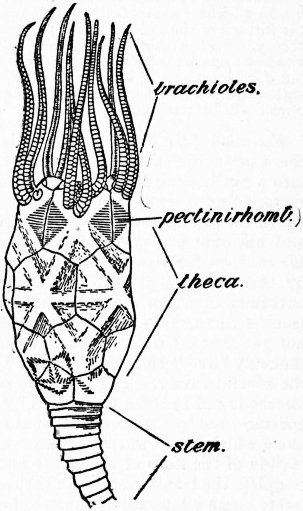
The rhombiferan cystoid Chirocrinus alter; Image by Encyclopedia Britannica

== See also ==
- Prehistoric echinoderms
- Paleozoic echinoderms
