= Zaouïa Formation =

Algerian geologic formation made up of sedimentary rock

- Stratigraphic range: Middle Ordovician; 468–461 Ma
- Type: Geological formation
- Underlies: Djurdjura Limestone
- Overlies: Akaoudj Tuff

Lithology
- Primary: Metamorphosed mudstone
- Other: Tuff

Location
- Coordinates: 36.9°N 4.0°E
- Approximate paleocoordinates: 72.8°S 98.3°E
- Region: Tizi Ouzou Province
- Country: Algeria
- Extent: Localized west of Aissa Mimoun Mountain

Type section
- Named for: Zaouïa of Stita
- Location: Sidi Namaane
- Coordinates: 36°46′05″N 004°01′54″E
- Zaouïa Formation (Algeria)

The Zaouïa Formation, also known as the Zaouïa Schists, is a Middle Ordovician (Darriwilian) geologic formation in Algeria. The formation crops out in the Aïssa Mimoun Massif near Zaouïa of Stita at the confluence of Wadi Stita and Wadi Seba at about 5 kilometres (3.1 mi) northeast of Tizi-Ouzou in the municipality of Makouda, in the Kabylian Mountains of northern Algeria. The type locality is about 29 kilometres (18 mi) away from the Katian outcrops of northern Djurdjura.

== Description ==
The Zaouïa Formation consists of slightly metamorphosed green or grey micaceous mudstones with many intercalated tuff beds.

== Fossil content ==
The following fossils were reported from the formation:

- Blastozoa
  - Lepidocalix pulcher
- Trilobites
  - Colpocoryphe arago
  - Pharostoma pulchra
- Hydrozoa
  - Inocaulis gigas
- Pterobranchia
  - Thallograptus barbieri
  - Dendrograptus sp.
  - ?Airograptus betieri
- Strophomenata
  - Actinomena orta
  - ?Strophomena barbieri

== See also ==
- Fezouata Formation
- Ordovician radiation
