= Diploporita =

Diploporita Temporal range: Ordovician–Devonian

Scientific classification
- Kingdom: Animalia
- Phylum: Echinodermata
- Subphylum: †Blastozoa
- Informal group: †Diploporita; Müller, 1854

Superfamilies
- Asteroblastida Bather, 1900; Glyptosphaeritida Bernard, 1895; Sphaeronitida Neumayr, 1889

Extinct group of marine invertebrates

Diploporita is an extinct group of blastozoans that ranged from the Ordovician to the Devonian. These echinoderms are identified by a specialized respiratory structure, called diplopores. Diplopores are a double pore system that sit within a depression on a single thecal (body) plate; each plate can contain numerous diplopore pairs.

== Taxonomy ==
While once considered to be a formal class, the diploporitans likely represent a polyphyletic group. The evidence for this claim lies within the highly morphologically diverse body plans of the diploporitans: there are major differences in the makeup of the attachment structure (e.g., stem or holdfast), in the makeup of the feeding grooves, and even major differences in the construction of the group-defining diplopore respiratory structures.

As of 2019 the only available phylogenetic analysis of Diploporita to date indicates that Diploporita is not a natural evolutionary group. Rather, it is an artificial grouping based on the presence of diplopores, that have re-evolved multiple times throughout the echinoderm evolutionary tree.

=== Ancestry ===
At this time, it is not clear to which group Diploporita is most closely related. It has been suggested that the paraphyletic group Eocrinoidea could have given rise to diploporitans, as well as other groups of blastozoans, but the evidence for this is inconclusive at this time.

=== Major sub-groups ===
There are three major groups of Diploporita that have been traditionally proposed: the Asteroblastida, Glyptosphaeritida, and the Sphaeronitida. These three groups, which are markedly different from one another, are found in approximately the same age strata in the Early Ordovician of the Prague Basin. Of these proposed groups, only one has been thought to be monophyletic: the Sphaeronitida. This group is characterized by short ambulacral feeding grooves and holdfasts that cement directly to a hard substrate, instead of a stem.

The following cladogram, representing a strict consensus of the 18 most parsimonious trees with a length of 99 steps, shows the monophyly of Sphaeronitida and (within it) Holocystidae. Most of the glyptosphaeritids shown are paraphyletic with respect to the sphaeronitids, and are in a polytomy with the representative of the paracrinoids and a complex clade. This complex clade includes a branch of rhombiferans, blastoids, parabloastoids (as sister to the lone asteroblastid diploporitan available for the study), and crinoids (as sister to an additional glyptosphaeritid diploporitan). Two eocrinoids form the outgroup, with the ascocystitid eocrinoid closer to the diploporitans than the gogiid.

- Gogia spiralus (Gogiid Eocrinoid)
- - Rhopalocystis destombesi (Ascocystitid Eocrinoid)
  - - - - - Eurekablastus rozhnovi (Parablastoid)
          - Asteroblastus stellatus
        - - Hybocrinus nitidus (Crinoid)
          - Eumorphocystis multiporata
      - - Cheirocystis fultonensis (Glyptocystitid Rhombiferan)
        - - Hemicosmites grandis (Hemicosmitid Rhombiferan)
          - Stephanocrinus angulatus (Coronate Blastoid)
    - Canadocystis barrandei (Paracrinoid)
    - Dactylocystis schmidti
    - Fungocystites rarissimus
    - Estonocystis antropoffi
    - Glyptosphaerites leuchtenbergi
    - - Tristomiocystis globossus
      - Sphaeronitida (Diploporitans)
        - Sphaeronities rossicum
        - - - Eucystis angelini
            - Haplosphaeronites oblonga
          - - - Triamara ventricosa
              - Aristocystites bohemicus
            - Holocystidae
              - Trematocystis magniporatus
              - - Pustulocystis pentax
                - Pentacystis gibsoni
              - Paulicystus densus
              - - Holocystites cylindricus
                - Holocystites scutellus
                - Holocystites salmoensis

== Distribution ==
Information concerning the distribution of diploporitan fossils is constantly changing, as more field sites are found and fossils from these are described. This description of diploporitan fossil occurrences is only meant to be a general introduction and is not an exhaustive list.

=== Ordovician ===
Diploporitans in the Ordovician were very diverse, with one source noting 168 species. Diploporitans are routinely found preserved from the Ordovician in Gondwana (i.e., southern Europe, northern Africa, the Middle East), Baltica, South China, and European Laurentia (e.g., United Kingdom). Ordovician occurrences of diploporitans in North American Laurentia are limited to only a very small number of instances. The Late Ordovician Bromide Formation is one of the few, and likely the most well-known, outcrops of diploporitan fossils, Eumorphocystis multiporata.

=== Silurian ===
The end-Ordovician extinction represented a large-scale extinction for diploporitans. The majority of diploporitan species went extinct during this period and they never returned to their high species numbers after this time. During the Silurian, there was a much larger presence of diploporitans in North American than during the Ordovician. These diploporitans, called the Holocystites Fauna, appeared in North America during the middle of the Silurian. These diploporitans, representing multiple genera, all share the same basic features: reduced food grooves, large plates to support feeding structures that branched off of the surface of the body, and specialized diplopore respiratory structures, called humatipores (diplopores that are connected by multiple canals below the surface of the plate). The Holocystites Fauna is mostly found in the midcontinental United States (e.g., Indiana, Wisconsin, Tennessee) and does not survive past the end of the Silurian.

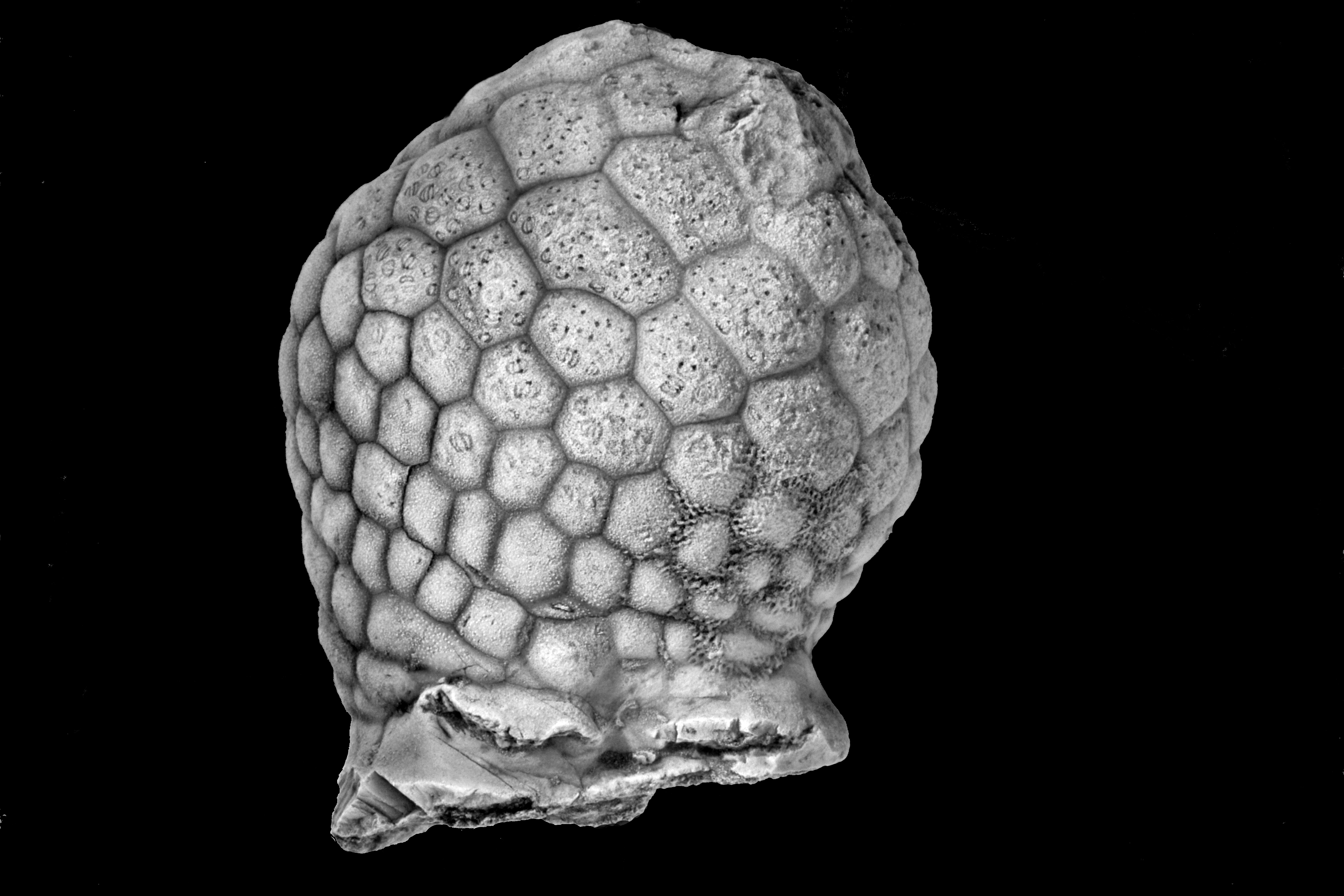
Paulicystis sparsus, holocystitid diploporitan from middle Silurian rocks of Indiana. Note the humatipore respiratory structures that pierce the plates of the body wall. (University of Iowa Paleontology Repository, SUI 48164)

Other Silurian occurrences of diploporitans worldwide are rare and limited to only a few species (e.g., Eucystis). These occurrences are largely restricted to southern Europe.

=== Devonian ===
Devonian occurrences of diploporitans are also quite rare. Most examples of this are, similar to the Silurian, limited to a few species in southern Europe. It was thought that diploporitans likely went extinct during the Early Devonian. However, a recent discovery found a new genus of diploporitan from the Middle Devonian, 50 million years after the last known diploporitan occurrence, in Kentucky, USA (Laurentia)
