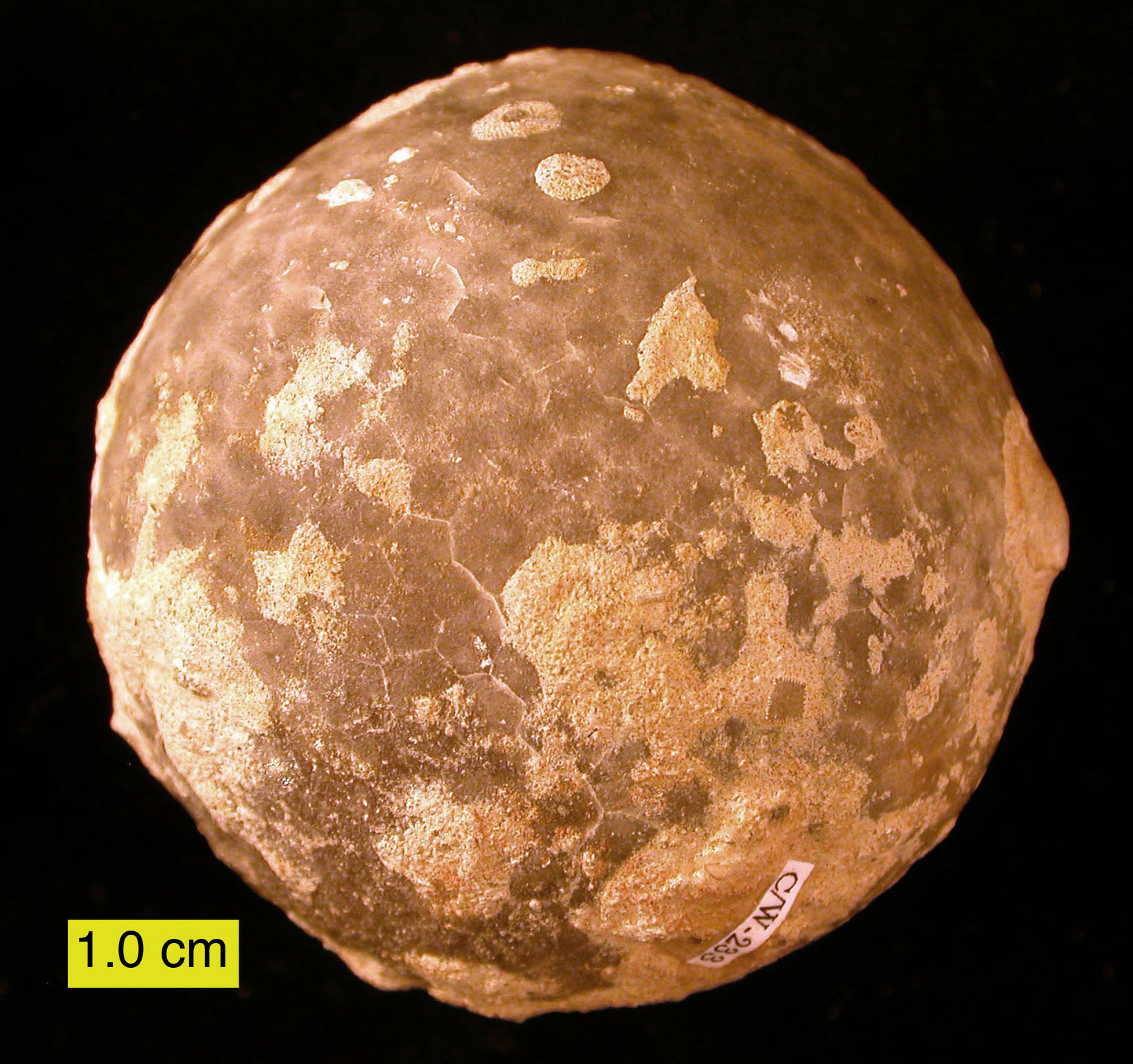
- Echinosphaerites aurantium from the Middle Ordovician of Estonia.

Scientific classification
- Kingdom: Animalia
- Phylum: Echinodermata
- Informal group: †Rhombifera
- Genus: †Echinosphaerites

= Echinosphaerites =

Echinosphaerites Temporal range: Early - Middle Ordovician

Extinct genus of marine invertebrates

Echinosphaerites is a genus of rhombiferan cystoid echinoderms that lived in the Early to Middle Ordovician of North America and Europe (Bockelie, 1981).

== Biology ==
Echinosphaerites had branched biserial brachioles which is rare for species belonging to the Class Rhombifera. Echinosphaerites had a skeletal meshwork like many other blastozoan echinoderms, with a fine outer mesh layer and an inner coarse mesh layer. During evolution the number and location of these brachioles, including the branching patterns, increased in the number of brachioles and complexity of the branching pattern. The exothecal pore structures increased in the complexity of patterns of tangential canals (Bockelie, 1981).
