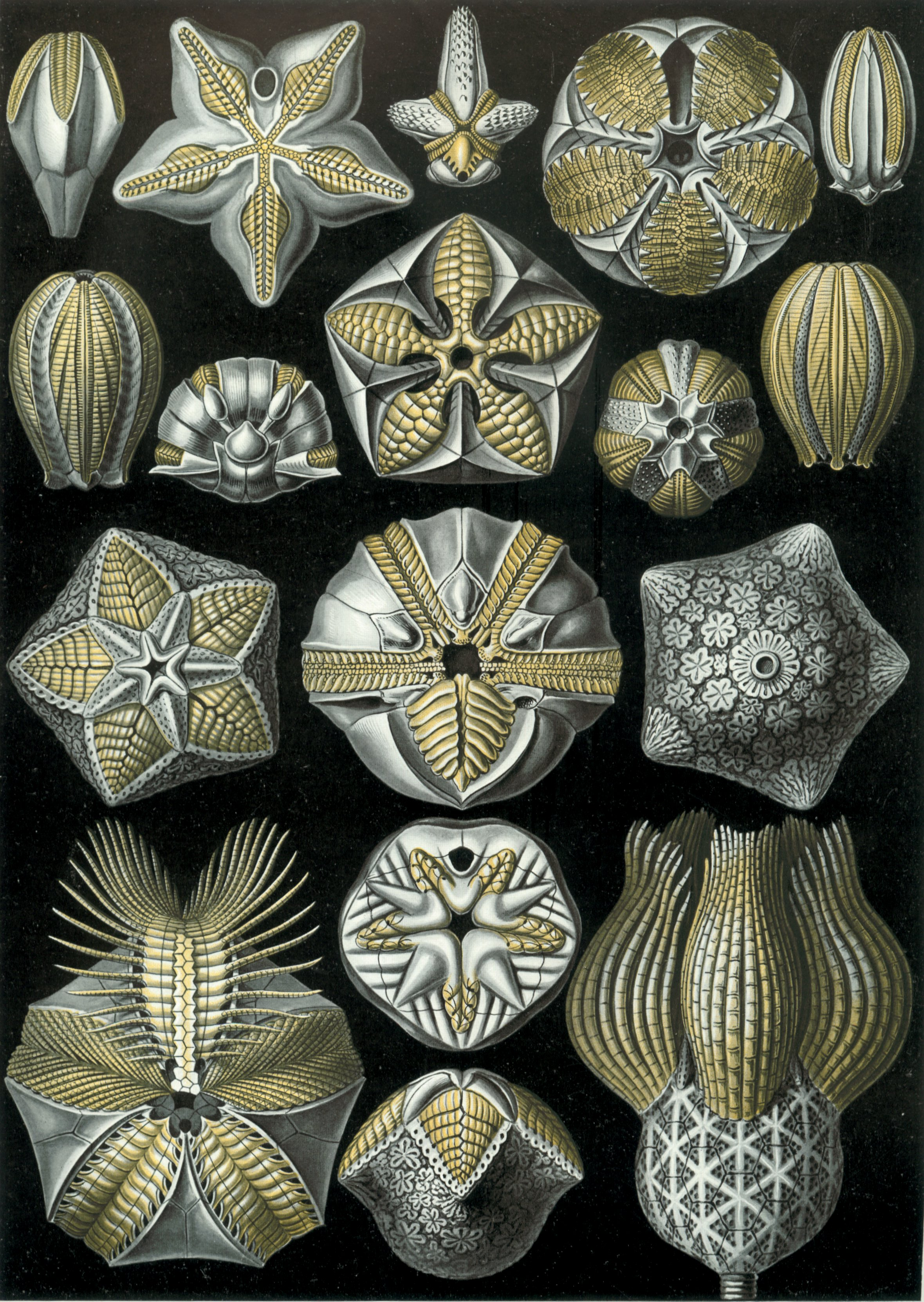
- Blastoids, an example of a single group of blastozoans.

Scientific classification
- Kingdom: Animalia
- Phylum: Echinodermata
- Subphylum: †Blastozoa

Classes
- Class Eocrinoidea (Cambrian - Silurian); Class Parablastoidea (Ordovician); Class Rhombifera (Ordovician - Devonian); Class Diploporita (Ordovician - Devonian); Class Blastoidea (Ordovician - Permian); Class Paracrinoidea (Ordovician-Silurian)

= Blastozoa =

Blastozoa Temporal range: Cambrian–Permian

Subphylum of marine invertebrates

Blastozoa is a subphylum of extinct echinoderms characterized by the presence of specialized respiratory structures and brachiole plates used for feeding. It ranged from the Cambrian to the Permian. Biserial, triradiate, and pentaradiate ambulacral patterns have been identified in blastozoa specimens. The pentaradiate pattern in particular has been associated with several different classes.

A significant species has been found at the Zaouïa Formation.
