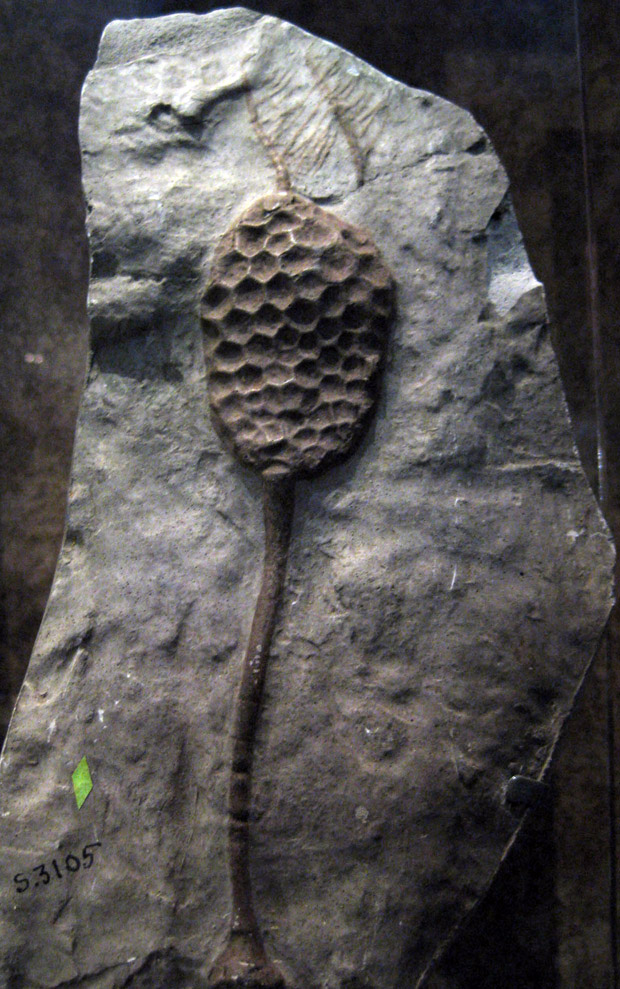
- Comarocystites punctatus

Scientific classification
- Kingdom: Animalia
- Phylum: Echinodermata
- Subphylum: †Blastozoa
- Class: †Paracrinoidea; Regnell, 1945

Orders
- Comarocystitida; Platycystitida

= Paracrinoidea =

Paracrinoidea Temporal range: Early Ordovician - Early Silurian

Extinct class of marine invertebrates

Paracrinoidea is an extinct class of blastozoan echinoderms. They lived in shallow seas during the Early Ordovician through the Early Silurian. While blastozoans are usually characterized by types of respiratory structures present, it is not clear what types of respiratory structures paracrinoids likely had. Despite the taxon's name, the paracrinoids are not closely related to crinoids.

Paracrinoids are characterized by a mouth with two to five feeding arms arranged asymmetrically, or somewhat bisymmetrically. They have a U-shaped gut, and their anus is located next to the mouth. They have irregularly shaped bodies (theca), and a stem, superficially similar to crinoids, and may have used the stem to attach themselves to a substrate, although some reconstructions show them partially buried in sediment.

Only 13 to 15 genera are known. See List of echinodermata orders

== Taxonomy ==
- Order †Comarocystitida
  - ?Family †Heckeritidae
    - †Heckerites
  - Family †Amygdalocystitidae
    - †Achradocystites Volborth, 1870
    - †Amygdalocystites Billings, 1854 (= Ottawacystis) (?= Billingsocystis)
    - †Oklahomacystis Parsley & Mintz, 1975 (Bassler, 1943)
    - †Ovulocystites Frest et al., 1980
  - Family †Comarocystitidae Balther, 1899
    - †Comarocystites Billings, 1854
    - †Implicaticystis
    - †Sinclairocystis
- Order †Platycystitida
  - Family †Platycystitidae
    - Subfamily †Canadocystinae Frest, Strimple, & Coney, 1979
      - †Canadocystis (=Sigmacystis)
    - Subfamily †Platycystitinae Frest, Strimple, & Coney, 1979
      - †Globulocystites Frest, Strimple, & Coney, 1979
        - †Globulocystites rotundatus Frest, Strimple, & Coney, 1979 (type)
        - †Globulocystites cristatus (Bassler) (Referred to Globulocystites by Frest, Strimple, & Coney, 1979)
        - †Globulocystites infundus Frest, Strimple, & McGinnis, 1977, p. 215 (Referred to Globulocystites from Platycystites by Frest, Strimple, & Coney, 1979)
      - †Platycystites Miller, 1889
        - †Platycystites faberi Miller, 1889 (type)
        - †Platycystites ovalis Frest, Strimple, & Coney, 1979
        - †Platycystites sp. Frest, Strimple, & Coney, 1979 (NMNH 112086, Blackriverian, Bromide Formation, Carter County, Oklahoma)
  - †Family Malocystitidae
    - †Malocystites
    - †Wellerocystis
  - †Family Bistomiacystitidae
    - †Bistomiacystis
- Order incertae sedis
  - †Family Springerocystidae Bassler, 1950 (suggested as paracrinoids related to Canadocystis by Sprinkle, 1973, but Parsley & Mintz, 1975 regarded them as eocrinoids, as originally described)
    - †Columbocystis
    - †Foerstecystis
    - †Springerocystis

Doubtful paracrinoids:

- †Allocystites (suggested as a paracrinoid related to Canadocystis by Sprinkle, 1973 but not Parsley & Mintz, 1975)
- †Paleocystites
- †Ulrichocystis

== Phylogeny ==
Cladogram after Limbeck (2018).

- Paracrinoidea
  - †C. laevis (Cryptocrinites laevis?)
  - - †Columbocystis ovata (Columbocystis ovata? Eocrinoid)
    - †Columbocystis typica
    - - - †Bistomiacystis globosa
        - †Bistomiacystis schrantzi
        - †Achradocystites schmidti
      - - - †Comarocystites punctatus
          - †Comarocystites tribrachius
          - †Implicaticystis shumardi
          - †Implicaticystis symmetricus
        - - †Canadocystis tennesseensis
          - - †Canadocystis barrandei
            - †Canadocystis emmonsi
            - - †Malocystites murchisoni
              - - †Sinclairocystis praedicta
                - - †Amygdalocystites florealis
                  - †Amygdalocystites radiatus
                  - †Oklahomacystis bibrachiatus
                  - †Oklahomacystis spissus
                  - †Oklahomacystis tribrachiatus
                  - †Oklahomacystis trigonis
                  - †Wellerocystis kimmswickensis
                - - †Globulocystites cristatus
                  - †Globulocystites rotundatus
                  - †Globulocystites infundus (originally Platycystites)
                  - †Platycystites cristatus
                  - †Platycystites faberi
