= Imbricata =

Imbricata Temporal range: Cambrian Stage 4–Drumian

Scientific classification
- Kingdom: Animalia
- Phylum: Echinodermata
- Class: †Eocrinoidea
- Order: †Imbricata; Sprinkle 1973

Groups included
- † Lepidocystidae; † Felbabkacystidae

Cladistically included but traditionally excluded taxa
- † Gogiida; † all other derived blastozoans

Order of extinct blastozoan echinoderms

Imbricata is a paraphyletic group of basal blastozoans that is traditionally considered to be an order. It is characterized by imbricate plating on some or all of the body wall, sharply delineated from the tesselate oral surface. This body organization is a plesiomorphic characteristic seen in other basal echinoderms such as Stromatocystites or Camptostroma. Imbricata contains the Lepidocystidae, which are the most basal group of blastozoans, and the Felbabkacystidae, which illustrate the transition to the Gogiida and other derived blastozoans.

== Phylogeny ==
The following cladogram, after Nardin et al. 2017 with slight modifications, shows the position of Imbricata relative to Gogiida and to Blastozoa as a whole, illustrating the basal position of the Lepidocystidae and the transitional position of the Felbabkacystidae:

- Blastozoa
  - Lepidocystidae
    - Kinzercystis
    - Vyscystis
    - Lepidocystis
  - - Felbabkacystidae
      Felbabkacystis
    - - Lyracystis
      - - - Akadocrinus
          - Gogia
          - Sinoeocrinus
          - Ubaghsicystis
        - - Lichenoides
          - - Trachelocrinus
            - Ridersia
            - (derived Blastozoa)
