= Felbabkacystis =

Felbabkacystis Temporal range: Drumian

Scientific classification
- Kingdom: Animalia
- Phylum: Echinodermata
- Class: †Eocrinoidea
- Order: †Imbricata
- Family: †Felbabkacystidae
- Genus: †Felbabkacystis; Nardin et al. 2017

Type species
- †Felbabkacystis luckae Nardin et al. 2017

Extinct genus of eocrinoid

Felbabkacystis is an extinct eocrinoid that is known only from the Drumian Jince Formation of the Czech Republic.. It is significant as a transitional form from the basal lepidocystids to the order Gogiida.

== Description ==
Felbabkacystis, like the other members of the Imbricata, features imbricate plating on both its relatively wide stalk and on much of its main body wall. However, unlike the more basal lepidocystids, the imbricate plating is only on the lower portion of the body, and the stalk is more clearly differentiated from the body. The tesselate oral surface is strongly vaulted, unlike the flat surface in lepidocystids, and the ambulacra are short, rather than extending across the entire oral surface. This illustrates the transition between the lepidocystids and the Gogiida, which have bodies featuring only tesselate plating, with the imbricate plating confined to the stalk and eventually replaced by stems with columnal plates.

== Phylogeny ==
The following cladogram, after Nardin et al. 2017 with slight modifications, shows the transitional position of Felbabkacystis:

- Lepidocystidae
  - Kinzercystis
  - Vyscystis
  - Lepidocystis
- - Felbabkacystidae
    Felbabkacystis
  - - Lyracystis
    - - - Akadocrinus
        - Gogia
        - Sinoeocrinus
        - Ubaghsicystis
      - - Lichenoides
        - - Trachelocrinus
          - Ridersia
          - (derived Blastozoa)

== Taxonomy ==
Nardin et al. take a strict cladistic approach and decline to use paraphyletic taxa including class Eocrinoidea and order Imbricata, assigning the Felbabkacystidae directly to subphylum Blastozoa. However, later sources refer to both Felbabkacystis and the Lepidocystidae as "imbricates" or formally assign the Felbabkacystidae to order Imbricata.
