= Mesones Group =

Geologic formation in Spain

- Stratigraphic range: Wuliuan-Drumian
- Type: Group

Lithology
- Primary: Shale

Location
- Region: Zaragoza
- Country: Spain

The Mesones Group is a Cambrian geologic group in Spain. It preserves numerous soft-bodied and hard-shelled taxa such as echinoderms and trilobites. It is often stated to contain the Mansilla, Murero and Valdemiedes Formations, however just as often the Murero Formation is used to refer to the entire group, with the main lagerstätte being placed interchangeably in Mansilla, the "broader" Murero or occasionally a broader Valdemiedes.

== Paleobiota ==
Color key: Taxon / Reclassified taxon / Taxon falsely reported as present / Dubious taxon or junior synonym / Ichnotaxon / Ootaxon / Morphotaxon	Notes; Uncertain or tentative taxa are in small text; ~~crossed out~~ taxa are discredited.

Paleobiota
Genus	Species	Higher taxon	Notes	Images
Ctenoimbricata	C. spinosa	Echinodermata	Most basal known echinoderm, completely bilateral unlike modern forms	Reconstruction of Ctenoimbricata
Dibrachicystis	D. purujoensis	Rhombifera	Bears unusual appendages, suggesting blastozoan and crinoid "arms" come from the same source	
Vizcainoia	V. moncaiensis	Rhombifera	Formerly placed inside Eocystites	
Protorophus	P. hispanicus	Edrioasteroidea	Earliest known member of Isorophidae	Fossil of Protorophus
Graciacystis	G. ambigua	Cincta	Basal cinctan, known from over a hundred specimens of different ages	
Aragocystites	A. belli	Edrioasteroidea	A relatively basal edrioasteroid, related to Cambraster	
Cambraster	C. tastudorum	Edrioasteroidea	First edrioasteroid found in Spain	
Protocinctus	P. mansillaensis	Cincta	Earliest known cinctan genus	Protocinctus fossil
Gogia	G. parsleyi	Eocrinoidea	Oldest records of the genus from Gondwana	Fossils of G. parsleyi
Rhopalocystis?	?R. mesonesensis	Eocrinoidea	Unclear whether it even belongs to the genus	
Gyrocystis	G. platessa, G. erecta, G. testudiformis, G. badulesiensis?	Cincta	A relatively diverse cinctan	Gyrocystis fossil
Caryosyntrips	C. cf. camurus	Panarthropoda	Frontal appendages (the only part known) formerly identified as the lobopodian "Mureropodia apae"	Fossil frontal appendage of C. cf. camurus (=Mureropodia apae)
Tuzoia	T. isuelaensis	Hymenocarina	Only known from carapaces, alongside an indeterminate euarthropod	Life restoration of Tuzoia
Wimanicharion	W. matthewi	Bradoriida	Also known from Sweden and Canada	
Naraoia	N. sp.	Naraoiidae	Some of the first evidence of Naraoia in Europe	N. sp. fossil from Murero
Peronopsis	P. ferox, P. insignis, P. longinqua	Agnostida	An incredibly common agnostid from all over the world	P. bidens fossil from Utah
Condylopyge	C. cruzensis	Condylopygidae		Cephalon of C. rex from the Czech Republic
Megagnostus	M. sp	Agnostida	Less common than Peronopsis, makes up fewer of the enrolled specimens in Murero	
Bailiaspis	B. tuberculata	Conocoryphidae	Unclear whether any Mesones specimens belong to the species	B. dalmani from the Whitesands Bay Formation
Bailiella	B. tenucincta	Conocoryphidae	A blind trilobite	
Conocoryphe	C. heberti	Conocoryphidae	An eyeless trilobite.	C. heberti fossil from Murero
Cornucoryphe	C. schirmi	Conocoryphidae	An unusual trilobite with a horn in the middle of its head	
Eccaparadoxides	E. pradoanus E. mediterraneus	Paradoxididae	Very abundant in Murero, had unique specialisations for enrolment and shows unusual variability	E. pradoanus fossil from Murero
Pardailhania	P. hispida, P. multispinosa, P. sdzuyi	Solenopleuridae	Used for stratigraphy in Murero	
Solenopleuropsis	S. marginata, S. thorali	Solenopleuridae	Exhibits circular enrolment alongside Pardailhania	
Dinesus	D. truyolsi	Dinesidae		
Alueva	A. undulata	Ellipsocephalidae	Exhibits paedomorphosis	
Wronascolex?	?W. sp	Palaeoscolecida	Formerly placed within Palaeoscolex	Palaeoscolex fossil
Marocella	M. morenensis	Helcionelloidea	Found in other localities across the world	
Trematobolus	T. simplex	Obolidae	Synonymous with the purported "bivalve" Lamellodonta	
Brahimorthis	B. alvaroi	Brahimorthidae (Orthida)	Relatively underived member of the genus	
Nisusia	N. sp	Kutorginata		
Serpulidae indet.	Unapplicable	Sabellida	Encrusted on shells	
Leptomitus	L. lineatus, L. conicus	Protomonaxonida	L. lineatus specimens may not belong to the species	L. teretiusculus from the Maotianshan Shales
Crumillospongia	C. mureroensis	Protomonaxonida	Bears larger pores than other members of the genus	C. frondosa from the Maotianshan Shales
Eiffelia?	?E. sp	Protomonaxonida	Only known from six-rayed spicules	E. globosa fossil from the Burgess Shale
Chancelloria	C. sp	Chancelloriidae	Also only known from spicules	C. pentacta fossil (from the US?)
Psammosphaera	P. sp	Astrorhizida (Foraminifera)	Mainly encrusted on shells	
