= Dibrachicystis =

Dibrachicystis Temporal range: Wuliuan

Scientific classification
- Kingdom: Animalia
- Phylum: Echinodermata
- Informal group: †Rhombifera
- Family: †Dibrachicystidae
- Genus: †Dibrachicystis; Zamora & Smith, 2011

Species
- †D. purujoensis Zamora & Smith, 2011 (type)

Extinct genus of marine invertebrates

Dibrachicystis is an extinct genus of rhombiferan echinoderm from the early Middle Cambrian (Miaolingian, Wuliuan, about 510 Ma). It is a stalked echinoderm within the family Dibrachicystidae which lived in what is now northernmost Iberian Chains, northern Spain. It is known from the holotype MPZ2009/1230 and from the paratypes MPZ2011/2–6. It was found in the uppermost part of the Murero Formation at Purujosa, Moncayo Natural Park, dating to the Lower Languedocian and referred to the Solenopleuropsis thorali Zone. It was first named by Samuel Zamora and A. B. Smith in 2011 and the type species is Dibrachicystis purujoensis.

== Phylogeny ==
Cladogram after Zamora & Smith, 2011 (all genera not part of a named bracket are eocrinoids):

- - Kinzercystis
  - - - Lyracystis
      - - Titanocrinus
        - Aethocrinus
    - - Gogia
      - Sinoeocrinus
      - - Akadocrinus
        - - Tatonkacystis
          - Ubaghsicystis
          - - Dibrachicystis
            - Pleurocystites
            - - Velieuxicystis
              - - Macrocystella
                - Ridersia
