= Lepidocystidae =

Lepidocystidae Temporal range: Cambrian Stage 4–Drumian
- The lepidocystid Kinzercystis

Scientific classification
- Kingdom: Animalia
- Phylum: Echinodermata
- Class: †Eocrinoidea
- Order: †Imbricata
- Family: †Lepidocystidae; Durham 1967

Genera
- Lepidocystis Foerste 1938; Kinzercystis Sprinkle 1973; Vyscystis Fatka & Kordule 1990

Extinct family of marine invertebrates

The Lepidocystidae (sometimes misspelled Lepidocystoidae, not to be confused with the class Lepidocystoidea that was proposed at the same time but later abandoned) are an extinct family that constitute the most basal known group within the paraphyletic class "Eocrinoidea", and therefore within the subphylum Blastozoa as a whole. Its members, along with the transitional Felbabkacystidae, are also known as "imbricates" or "imbricate Eocrinoids" after the likewise paraphyletic order Imbricata.

Lepidocystids demonstrate that echinoderms had already developed five equally well-developed ambulacra in five-sided radial symmetry. However, this group had not yet developed pentameral symmetry in its plate arrangements.

== Phylogeny ==
The following cladogram, after Nardin et al. 2017 with slight modifications, shows the basal position of the Lepidocystidae and the transitional position of the Felbabkacystidae:

- Blastozoa
  - Lepidocystidae
    - Kinzercystis
    - Vyscystis
    - Lepidocystis
  - - Felbabkacystidae
      Felbabkacystis
    - - Lyracystis
      - - - Akadocrinus
          - Gogia
          - Sinoeocrinus
          - Ubaghsicystis
        - - Lichenoides
          - - Trachelocrinus
            - Ridersia
            - (derived Blastozoa)

== Taxonomy ==
The following genera and species are members of the Lepidocystidae:

- Family Lepidocystidae (Durham 1967)
  - Lepidocystis (Foerste 1938)
    - L. wanneri (Foerste 1938)
  - Kinzercystis (Sprinkle 1973)
    - K. durhami (Sprinkle 1973)
  - Vyscystis (Fatka & Kordule 1990)
    - V. ubaghsi (Fatka & Kordule 1990)
    - V.? spinosa (Wang et al. 2024)

An additional lepidocystid species similar to Lepidocystis has been found in Cambrian Stage 3 rocks from western Gondwana, but not yet formally described. If confirmed as a lepidocystoid, it would extend the range of the clade to the earliest stage known to contain confirmed echinoderms.
