= Conocephalites =

Conocephalites Barrande, 1852, is a disused name for a genus of trilobite, of which the species have now been reassigned to other genera. The name was introduced as a replacement for Conocephalus Zenker, 1833, which was unavailable since Thunberg used it in 1815 for a genus of conehead bushcricket. Barrande however was unaware that Conocoryphe had already been proposed by Hawle and Corda in 1847.

The following species have been reassigned.

- C. anatinus = Monocheilus anatinus
- C. antiquatus = Elrathia antiquata
- C. bailey = Bailiella bailey
- C. bavaricus = Leimitzia bavarica
- C. calciferous = Saratogia calcifera
- C. cirina = Conocoryphe cirina
- C. elegans = Bailiaspis elegans
- C. eryon = Kendallina eryon
- C. hofensis = Bavarilla hofensis
- C. micros = Conocoryphe micros
- C. nasutus = Maustonia nasutus
- C. ornatus = Conokephalina ornata
- C. oweni = Stigmacephalus oweni
- C. patersoni = Psalaspis patersoni
- C. robbi = Brunswickia robbi
- C. shumardi = Taenicephalus shumardi
- C. stephensi = Tasmanocephalus stephensi
- C. subcoronatus = Alokistocare subcoronatus
- C. sulzeri = Conocoryphe sulzeri
- C. zenkeri = Loganopeltoides zenkeri
