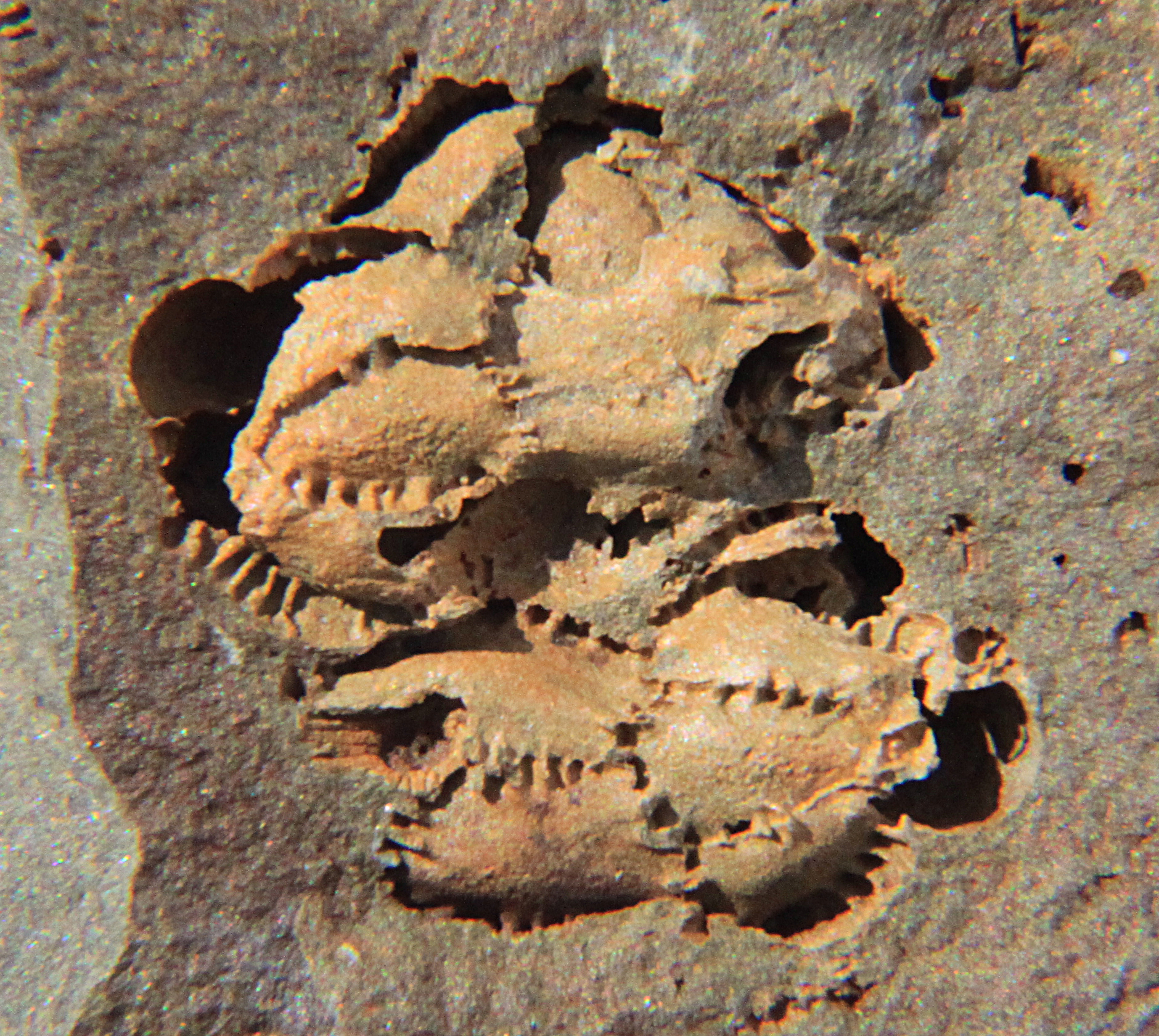
- 2 specimens of Lichenoides priscus 10mm

Scientific classification
- Kingdom: Animalia
- Phylum: Echinodermata
- Class: †Eocrinoidea
- Order: †Gogiida
- Family: †Lichenoididae
- Genus: †Lichenoides; Barrande, 1846

Species
- L. priscus Barrande, 1846 (type); L. vadosus Parsley & Prokop, 2004

= Lichenoides =

Lichenoides Temporal range: Middle Cambrian

Extinct genus of marine invertebrates

Lichenoides is an extinct genus of eocrinoid echinoderms that lived during the Middle Cambrian. It is endemic to West Gondwana, and has been found in what is now Bohemia and Spain.

== Description ==
Lichenoides is an eocrinoid with an ovoid to nearly circular theca. In place of the more typical stem, the aboral surface ends with a varying number of small platelets. Brachioles are singular or split into a pair just above the base.

== Ecology ==
L. priscus, the type species, occurs in deeper water, lower energy sediments, while L. vadosus is found in shallower water, higher eneregy sediments. The genus has been interpreted as a soft sediment sticker in the past, but more recent work with additional specimens has led to it being re-interpreted as a hard substrate attacher.

== Phylogeny ==
Lichenoides the type genus of the family Lichenoididae (sometimes misspelled Lichenoidae). Lichenoididae is crownward from the Lyracystidae and Eocrinidae within the order Gogiida but basal to all other eocrinoids and other blastozoans that are more derived than gogiids as shown in the following cladogram, after Nardin et al. 2017 with slight modifications:

- Blastozoa
  - Lepidocystidae
    - Kinzercystis
    - Vyscystis
    - Lepidocystis
  - - Felbabkacystidae
      Felbabkacystis
    - - Lyracystis
      - - - Akadocrinus
          - Gogia
          - Sinoeocrinus
          - Ubaghsicystis
        - - Lichenoides
          - - Trachelocrinus
            - Ridersia
            - (derived Blastozoa)
