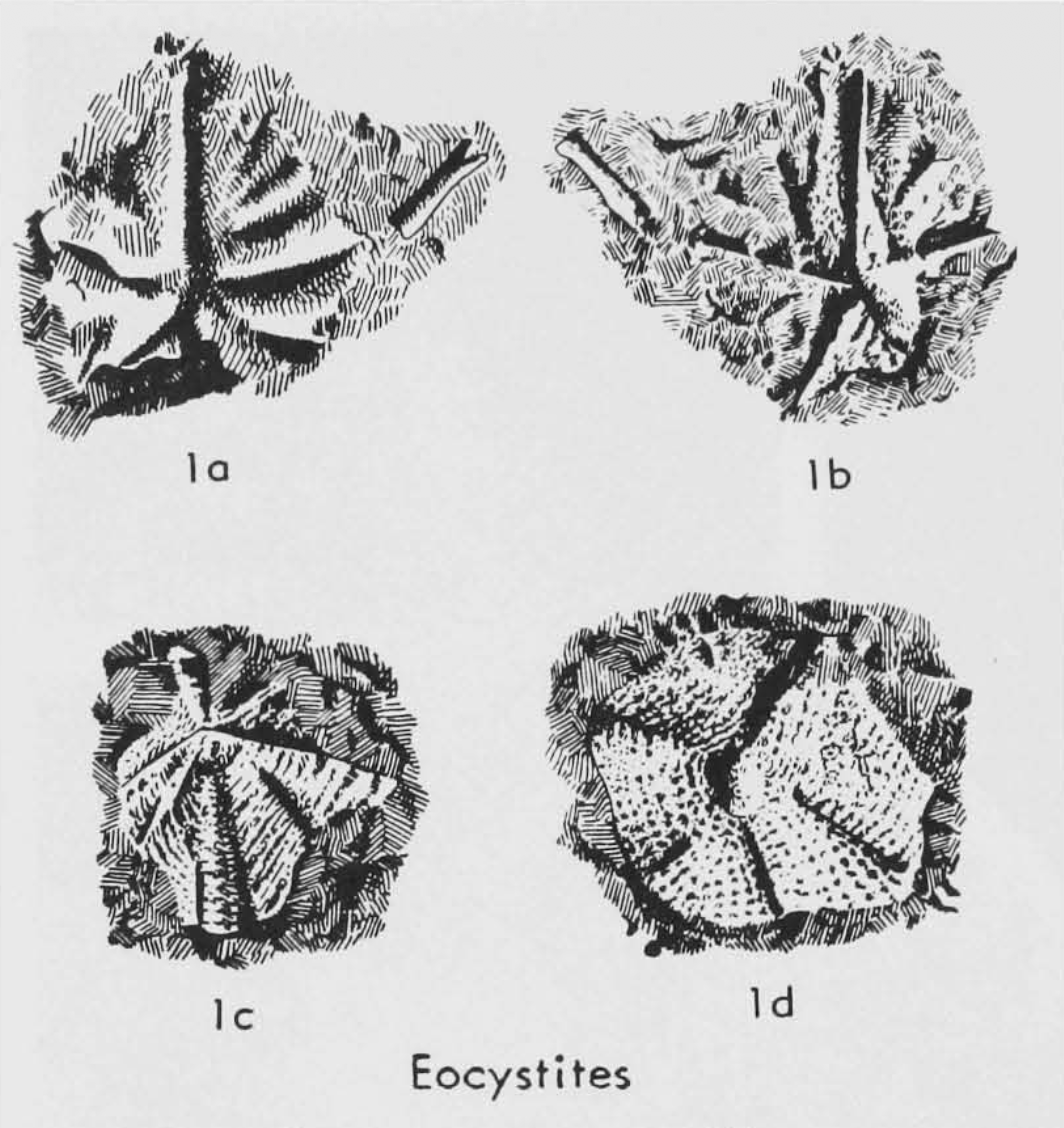
- E. primaevus isolated plates

Scientific classification
- Kingdom: Animalia
- Phylum: Echinodermata
- Class: †Eocrinoidea
- Order: †Ascocystitida (?)
- Genus: †Eocystites; Billings in Dawson 1868

Type species
- E. primaevus Billings in Dawson 1868

= Eocystites =

Eocystites Temporal range: Middle Cambrian

Extinct genus of marine invertebrates

Eocystites is a poorly-known genus of Middle Cambrian echinoderm tentatively assigned to the Eocrinoidea. The type specides, E. primaevus, known only from isolated plates from the Acadian Group of rocks near St. John, New Brunswick, is the only valid species. Of the other two proposed species, E. longidactylus has subsequently been assigned to Gogia by way of its junior synonym Eocrinus, while E. languidocianus has been assigned to Vizcainoia as its type species.

Additional isolated plates belonging to an indeterminate species of Eocystites have been found from the Middle Cambrian of southern Spain.

While various sources including IRMNG credit Hartt for the genus, others including PBDB correctly credit Elkanah Billings. The confusion likely arises from the line "Eocystites primaevus, Billings, Coll. Hartt", intended to indicate that Hartt collected the specimens. The text further states that the specimens are "regarded by Mr. Billings, to whom the specimens have been submitted, as indicating a new genus of Cystideans."

Eocystites has been tentatively assigned to the order Ascocystitida, although previous sources have only even considered it an eocrinoid "for lack of a better place to assign it."
