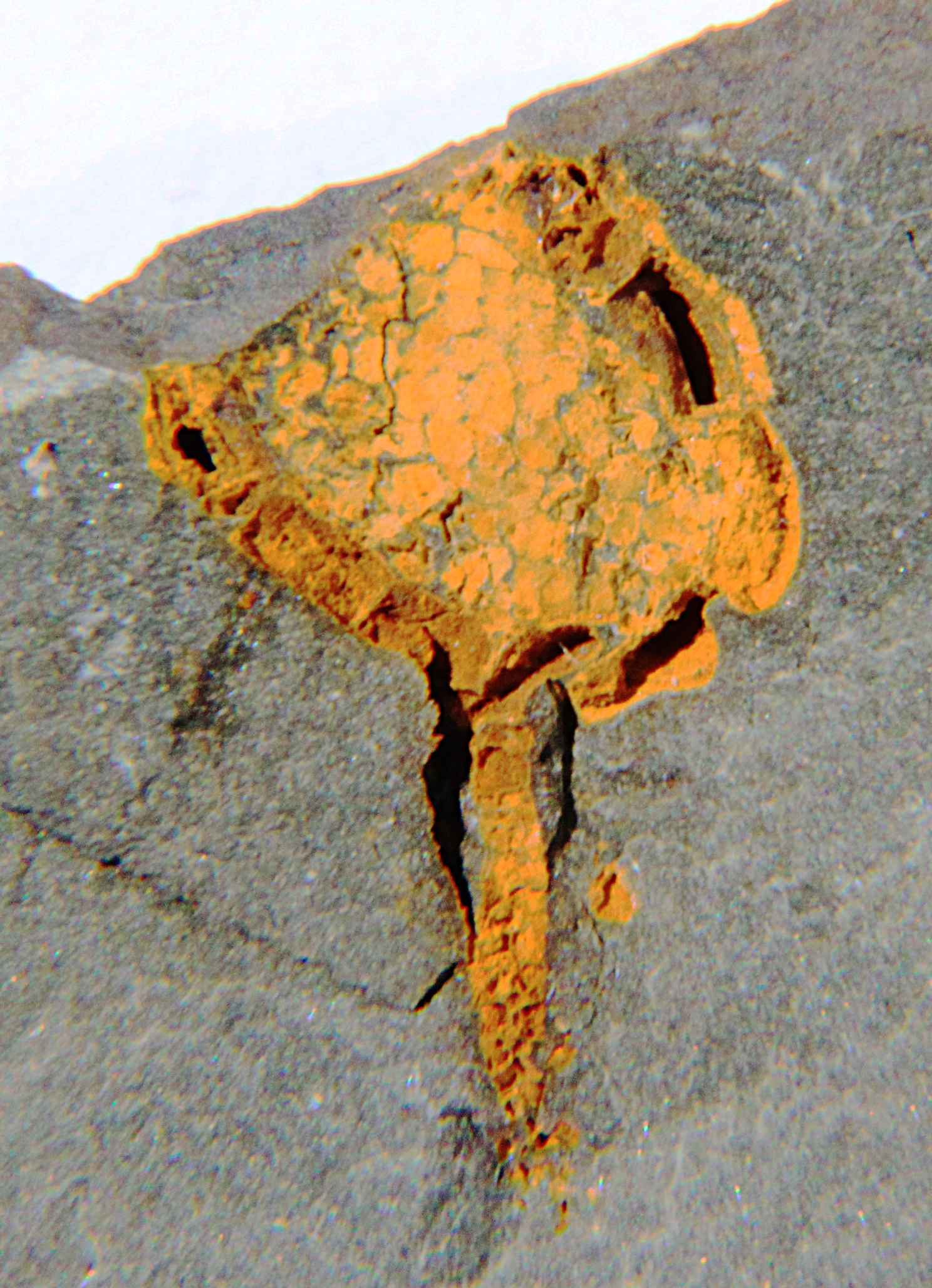
- Trochocystites bohemicus from the Czech Republic with a length of 15 millimetres (0.59 in)

Scientific classification
- Kingdom: Animalia
- Superphylum: Deuterostomia
- Clade: Ambulacraria
- Phylum: Echinodermata
- Class: †Cincta; Jaekel, 1918

Families
- †Trochocystitidae; †Gyrocystidae; †Sucocystidae

= Cincta =

Cincta Temporal range: Miaolingian

Extinct class of marine invertebrates

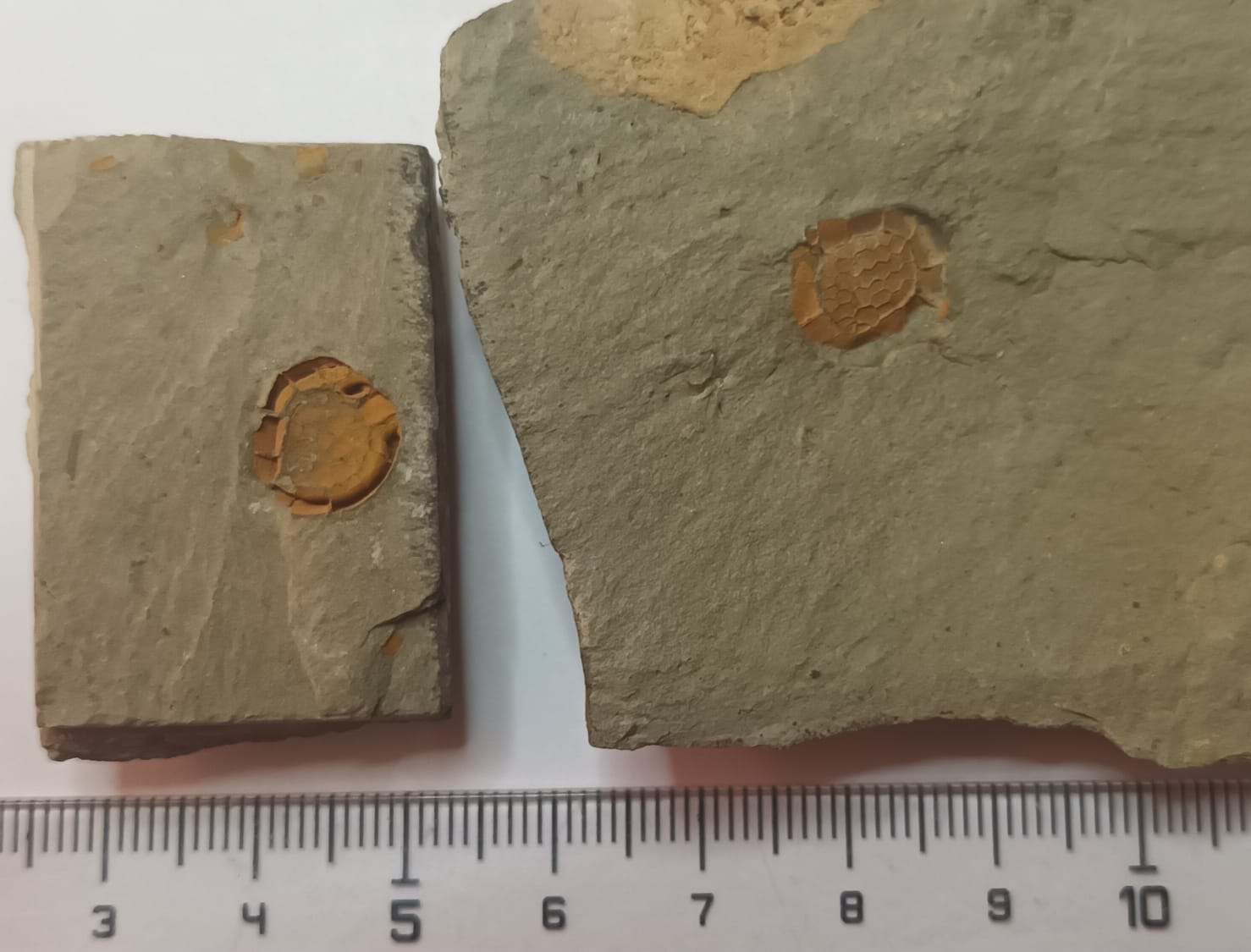
Sucocystis theronensis from the Middle Cambrian of Couloma, Hérault, France. Max Rouger Collection.

Cincta is an extinct class of echinoderms that lived only in the Middle Cambrian epoch. Homostelea is a junior synonym. The classification of cinctans is controversial, but they are probably part of the echinoderm stem group.

Cinctans were sessile, asymmetrical animals with a skeleton made of stereom plates and a racquet-shaped body composed of a theca and stele. They may have had a lifestyle similar to modern tunicates, filter-feeding by pumping water through gill slits in their pharynx.

== Description ==
Cinctans were asymmetrical animals, though some species were nearly bilaterally symmetrical. Like all echinoderms, cinctans have a skeleton made of plates of stereom. The body of cinctans was divided into two sections, the main body, called the theca, and a posterior appendage called a stele. The overall shape of cinctans has been compared to a tennis racquet. The theca of cinctans was surrounded on its margins by a frame of large stereom plates called a cinctus, and the dorsal and ventral surfaces were covered in a tessellated arrangement of small plates. The stele was essentially an extension of the cinctus, rather than a discrete appendage, and would have been fairly stiff side-to-side but possibly more flexible up and down. The stele was not a holdfast, but may have served to stabilize the animal. In most cinctans, the overall shape of the theca was only mildly asymmetrical, but in the unusual genus Lignanicystis the theca was highly asymmetrical, convergent on the stylophorans in some respects. The species Graciacystis could reach a theca length of 14.5 millimetres (0.57 in).

The theca of cinctans contained three major openings. The mouth was located on the right side of the anterior end, in the cinctus, and was associated with marginal grooves. All species had a left marginal groove, but the right marginal groove was sometimes absent and always shorter than the left one. The anus was located near the anterior end, on the right side, indicating that the gut was U-shaped. It was surrounded by a cone of plates equivalent to the periproct of modern echinoderms. The largest opening, called the porta, was located at the anterior end and was covered by an operculum. It was likely an atrial opening like that of tunicates.

The asymmetry of the marginal groove likely indicates that cinctans had a water vascular system comprising two hydrocoels, with the left hydrocoel larger than the right. In species with only a left marginal groove, the right hydrocoel may have been absent as in modern echinoderms.

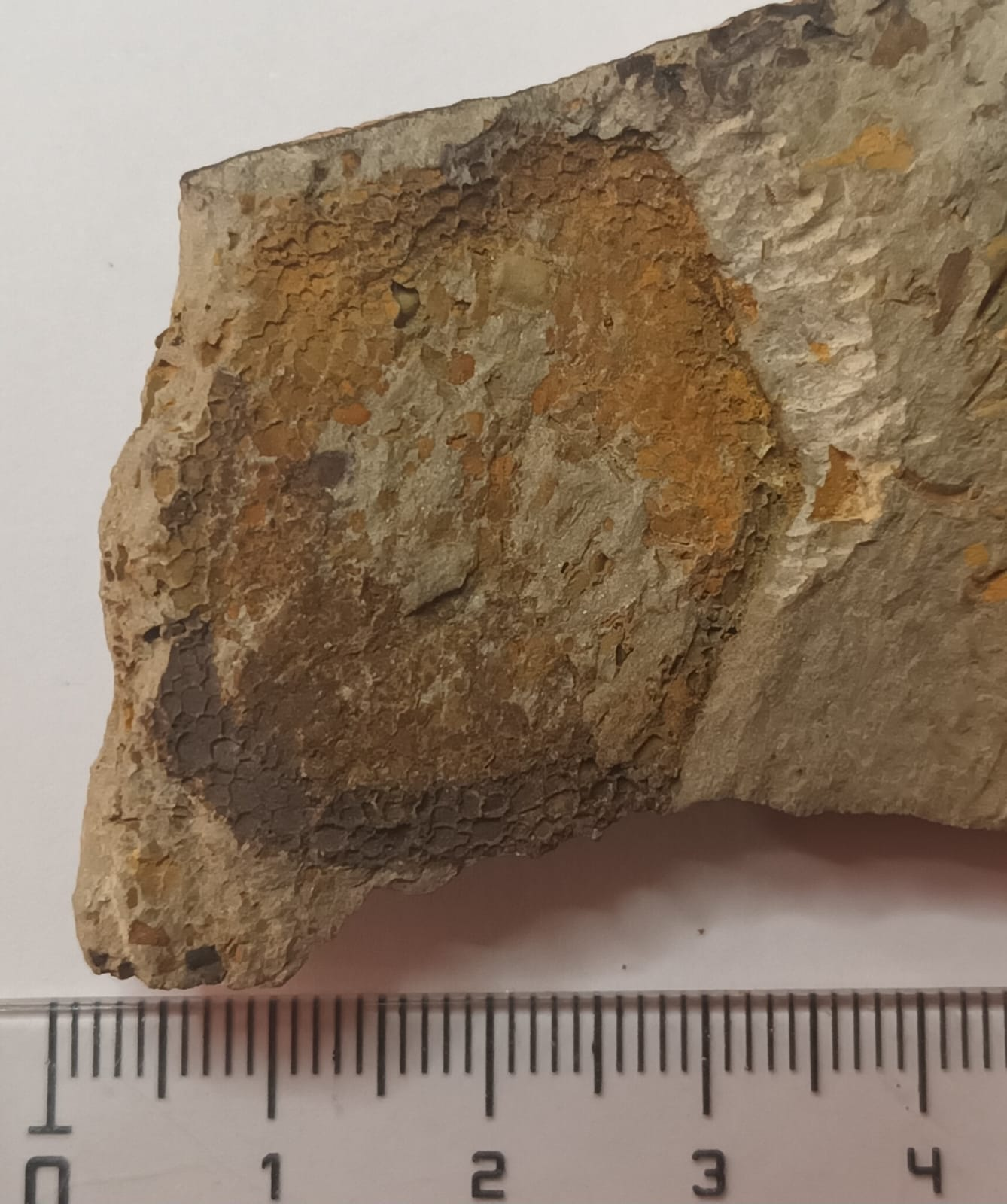
Cambraster cannati from the Middle Cambrian of Couloma, Hérault, France. Max Rouger Collection.

== Biology ==
Cinctans have been hypothesized to be epibenthic suspension feeders, with a lifestyle similar to modern tunicates. They likely rested on the seafloor parallel to the current, with their mouth and porta oriented downstream. They likely fed by actively pumping water through their pharynx.

Cinctans grew largely by the expansion of the plates. A small number of plates were added to the stele, and somewhat more to the dorsal and ventral surfaces, during growth, but the number of plates making up the cinctus remained constant throughout growth. Because of the asymmetric anatomy of cinctans, they likely underwent torsion when metamorphosing from a larva into an adult.

== Classification ==
- Chordata
- - Hemichordata
    - Pterobranchia
    - Enteropneusta
  - Echinodermata
    - Ctenocystoidea
    - - Cincta
      - - Soluta
        - - Helicoplacus
          - - Camptostroma
            - - Stromatocystites
              - - Kinzercystis
                - - Gogia
                  - - Akadocrinus
                    - - Pleurocystites
                      - Ubaghsicystis
                    - - Macrocystella
                      - Aethocrinus

Phylogenetic position of Cincta within Deuterostomia

The classification of cinctans, like that of other carpoid echinoderms, is contentious. They have been hypothesized to be blastozoans, stem-group hemichordates, and stem-group echinoderms.

Phylogenetic analyses have found cinctans to be stem-group echinoderms, intermediate between ctenocystoids and solutans.

- Asturicystis
- Trochocystitidae
  - Trochocystites
  - Trochocystoides
- - Sotocinctus
  - - Graciacystis
    - - Protocinctus
      - Gyrocystidae
        - Progyrocystis
        - Gyrocystis
      - Sucocystidae
        - Ludwigicinctus
        - - Undatacinctus
          - - Sucocystis
            - - Lignanicystis
              - Elliptocinctus

Phylogenetic relationships within Cincta

The internal phylogenetic relationships within cinctans have been difficult to study, due in part to their highly specialized anatomy making it difficult to determine their ancestral anatomy. However, three families are recognized, the Trochocystidae, Gyrocystidae, and Sucocystidae, as well as some basal genera which do not fit into any of the families.

== Distribution ==
All cinctan fossils are from the Middle Cambrian. The earliest cinctan is Protocinctus, which dates to Cambrian Stage 5, now known as the Wuliuan. Their diversity peaked during the Drumian. The youngest cinctans are in the genera Undatacinctus and Sucocystis. Cinctans died out just prior to the beginning of the Furongian epoch, during the Guzhangian age. The decline of cinctans was associated with a marine regression, and cinctans may have struggled to migrate as sea levels changed or run out of habitat due to the regression and cooling.

Cinctan fossils are found in the former continents of Siberia, Avalonia, and western Gondwana. They have been found in the Czech Republic, France, Germany, Italy, Morocco, Russia, Spain, and the United Kingdom.

== History ==
The first cinctan named, Trochocystites, was described in 1887. Cinctans were originally considered to be cystoids, but in the early 20th century they were recognized as a distinct group. Because Cincta was originally described as an order, they were later assigned to their own subclass Homostelea, but Homostelea is now considered a junior synonym of Cincta.

Under the calcichordate interpretation of carpoids, cinctans were initially interpreted as basal stem-group echinoderms. Later, however, they, as well as ctenocystoids, were interpreted as possible stem-group hemichordates under the calcichordate interpretation.
