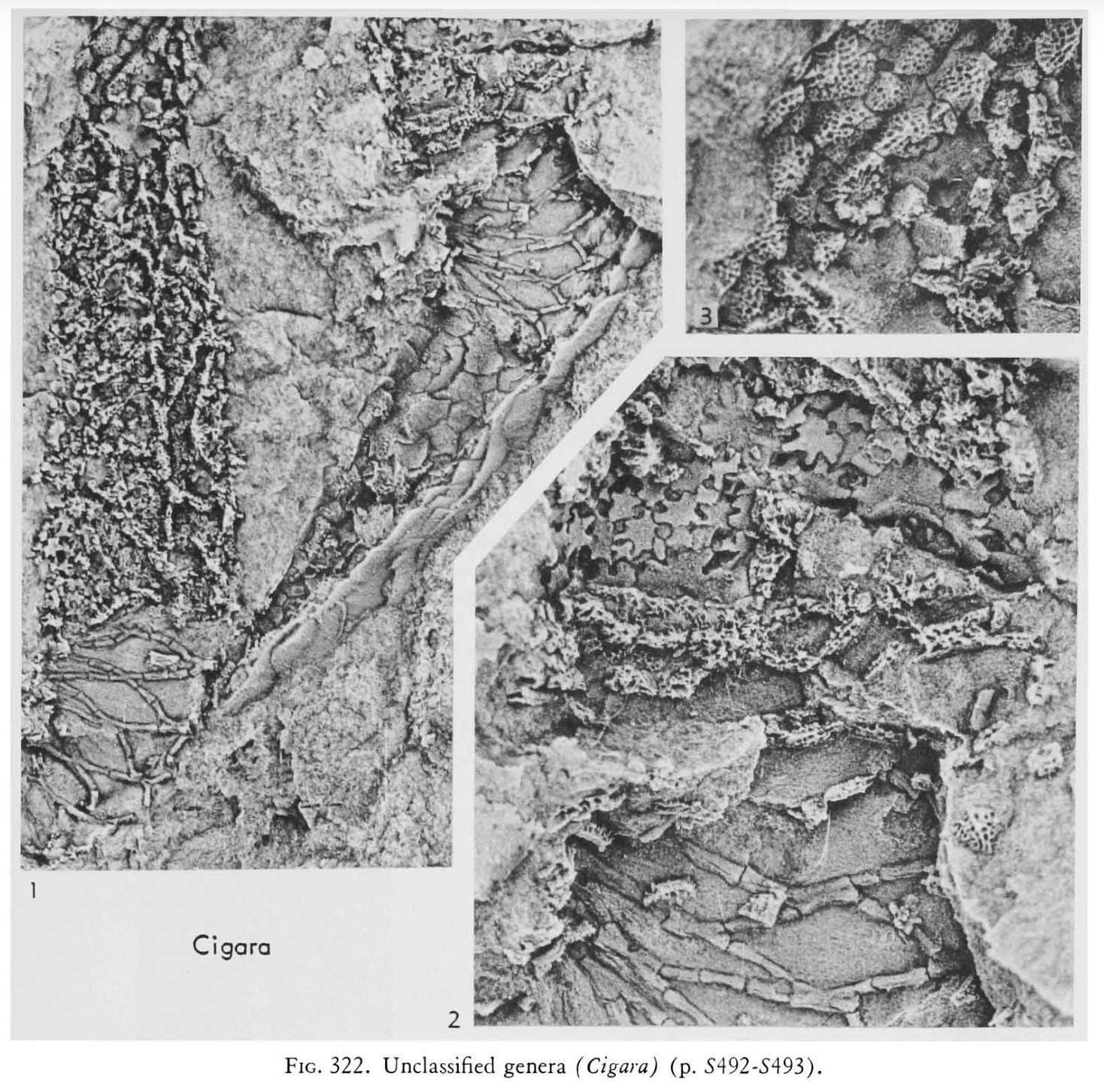

Scientific classification
- Kingdom: Animalia
- Phylum: Echinodermata
- Class: †Eocrinoidea (?)
- Genus: †Cigara; Barrande 1887

Type species
- †C. dusli

Species
- C. dusli Barrande 1887

= Cigara =

Cigara Temporal range: Middle Cambrian

Extinct genus of marine invertebrates

Cigara (sometimes misspelled Cigaria) is an extinct echinoderm genus of uncertain affinities, generally placed incertae sedis within the Eocrinoidea. It contains a single species, C. dusli, that is known only from two incomplete specimens on a single slab collected from the Middle Cambrian Jince Formation of the Czech Republic.

== Description ==
The body of Cigara has three parts, with the middle part creating a roughly 40° bend between the conical outer parts. The middle part features an unusual lattice structure of thin elongate plates crossing in X-shaped patterns. Neither of the specimens preserve the end of either cone, and no feeding appendages are apparent.

Some researchers have interpreted Cigara as a shallow sediment sticker, meaning that part of its body would have sat within a stabilized substrate. However, others find it better to consider the mode of attachment uncertain due to the poor preservation of all reported specimens.

== Classification ==
The assignment of Cigara to the Eocrinoidea has been based on the presence of respiratory structures known as epispires in middle section of the body. Respiratory structures have traditionally been used to assign blastozoan echinoderms to traditional classes. However, this is no longer seen as a way to define monophyletic clades due to the diversity of structures, as well as convergent evolution of similar structures in different groups.

=== Rejected affinities ===
While Cigara has previously been proposed as synonymous with Dendrocystites (a solute), or with Acanthocystites (a gogiid eocrinoid), the 1967 Treatise on Invertebrate Paleontology deemed these associations "unacceptable" and placed it in the section for unclassified eocrinoids.

=== Possible connection to Stylophora ===
In his 1973 classification that established Blastozoa (including Eocrinoidea) as a subphylum, James Sprinkle noted that epispires appear in other classes of early echinoderms, including Stylophora. He further noted that the only structures similar to the X-shaped lattice appear in stylophorans, and that Cigara could be a "very early and perhaps abberrant" stylophoran.

Based on this, Sprinkle predicted that when complete specimens are found, they will not have the biserial brachioles characteristic of blastozoans. However, while he advocated removing Cigara from Eocrinoidea, Sprinkle did not assign it to Stylophora. He considered that Cigara might warrant being placed in its own class, but that there was not enough clear information to formally erect such a class.

More recent research has suggested that the stylophoran aulacophore is most parsimoniously interpreted as a modified brachiole, as the water vascular system is not accompanied by the a somatocoelar derivative as it is in crinoid arms. Additionally, while most brachioles have biserial ossicles, in several species they are monoserial as they are in stylophorans. Therefore Cigara having stylophoran affinites would not remove it from the blastozoa.

Later taxonomies have continued to include Cigara in Eocrinoidea, albeit tentatively.
