= Vizcainoia =

Vizcainoia Temporal range: Wuliuan

Scientific classification
- Kingdom: Animalia
- Phylum: Echinodermata
- Informal group: †Rhombifera
- Family: †Dibrachicystidae
- Genus: †Vizcainoia; Zamora & Smith, 2011

Species
- †V. languedocianus (Ubaghs, 1987) (type); †V. moncaiensis Zamora & Smith, 2011

Extinct genus of marine invertebrates

Vizcainoia is an extinct genus of rhombiferan echinoderms from the early Middle Cambrian (Miaolingian, Wuliuan, about 510 Ma). It is a stalked echinoderm within the family Dibrachicystidae which lived in what is now France and Spain.

The type species, Vizcainoia languedocianus, is known from the holotype MNHN F.A38500 and from the paratype MNHN A38542. V. languedocianus was discovered in Montagne Noire, France, dating to the Lower Languedocian and referred to the Solenopleuropsis Zone. This species was first assigned to Eocystites languedocianus by Ubaghs (1987). In 2011, it was reassigned to its own genus, Vizcainoia, and a second species was first described and named by Samuel Zamora and A. B. Smith. V. moncaiensis is known from the holotype MPZ2011/7. It was found in the uppermost part of the Murero Formation at Purujosa, Moncayo Natural Park of northernmost Iberian Chains, northern Spain, dating to the Lower Languedocian and referred to the Pardailhania multispinosa Zone.
