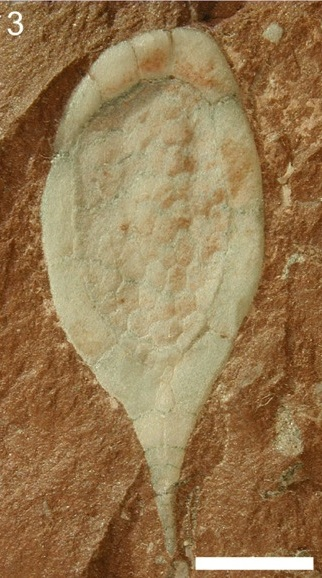
- Ventral view of a specimen of Protocinctus mansillaensis

Scientific classification
- Kingdom: Animalia
- Phylum: Echinodermata
- Class: †Cincta
- Family: †Sucocystidae
- Genus: †Protocinctus; Rahman & Zamora, 2009
- Species: †P. mansillaensis

Binomial name
- †Protocinctus mansillaensis Rahman & Zamora, 2009

= Protocinctus =

Protocinctus Temporal range: Miaolingian (Wuliuan), 506.5–504.5 Ma

Extinct genus of echinoderms

Protocinctus is a genus of cinctan and, as of 2024, it is the oldest such recognized genus. It is known from the Wuliuan age of the Mansilla Formation, Zaragoza, Spain. It is represented by the single species Protocinctus mansillaensis.

== Description ==
The genus bears a combination of characters unique to cinctans, with an elongated oval-shaped theca with a single anterior left marginal feeding groove, and a posterior marginal frame open in posterior ventral view.

Like other cinctans, they would have been active pharyngeal filter feeders. The animal would lay close to the sediment surface with the anterior region oriented downstream and generate an inhalant flow of water directing suspended food particles to the mouth.
