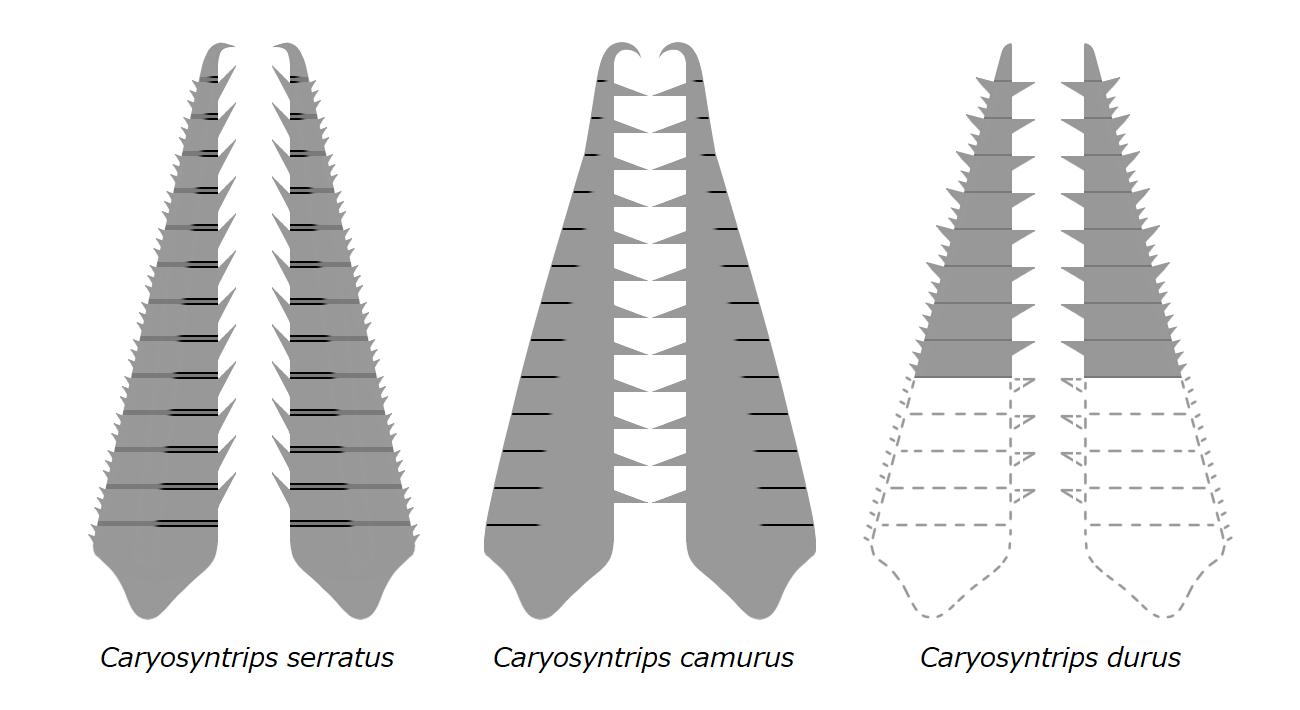
- Frontal appendages of Caryosyntrips

Scientific classification
- Kingdom: Animalia
- Stem group: Arthropoda
- Genus: †Caryosyntrips; Daley & Budd, 2010

Type species
- Caryosyntrips serratus Daley & Budd, 2010

Species
- Caryosyntrips serratus Daley & Budd, 2010; Caryosyntrips camurus Pates & Daley, 2017; Caryosyntrips durus Pates & Daley, 2017

Synonyms
- Mureropodia apae Gámez, Liñán & Zhuravlev, 2011

= Caryosyntrips =

Caryosyntrips Temporal range: Middle Cambrian

Extinct genus of arthropod

Caryosyntrips ("nutcracker") is an extinct genus of stem-arthropod which known from Canada, United States and Spain during the middle Cambrian. It was first named by Allison C. Daley and Graham E. Budd in 2010, with the type species being Caryosyntrips serratus.

== Etymology ==
The scientific name Caryosyntrips comes from Greek karyon, "nut"; and syntrips, "the smasher", a spirit from Greek mythology.

== Occurrence ==
Multiple species had been recovered from the Burgess Shale Formation, Canada, Wheeler Shale and Marjum Formation, United States, and Valdemiedes Formation, Spain. The latter contains a large specimen, which was initially misidentified as a body remain of lobopodian ("Mureropodia apae"). While the assignment of "Mureropodia" as a misidentified appendage was controversial, the previous lobopodian affinity was less tenable than the fossil being a Caryosyntrips appendage.

== Description ==
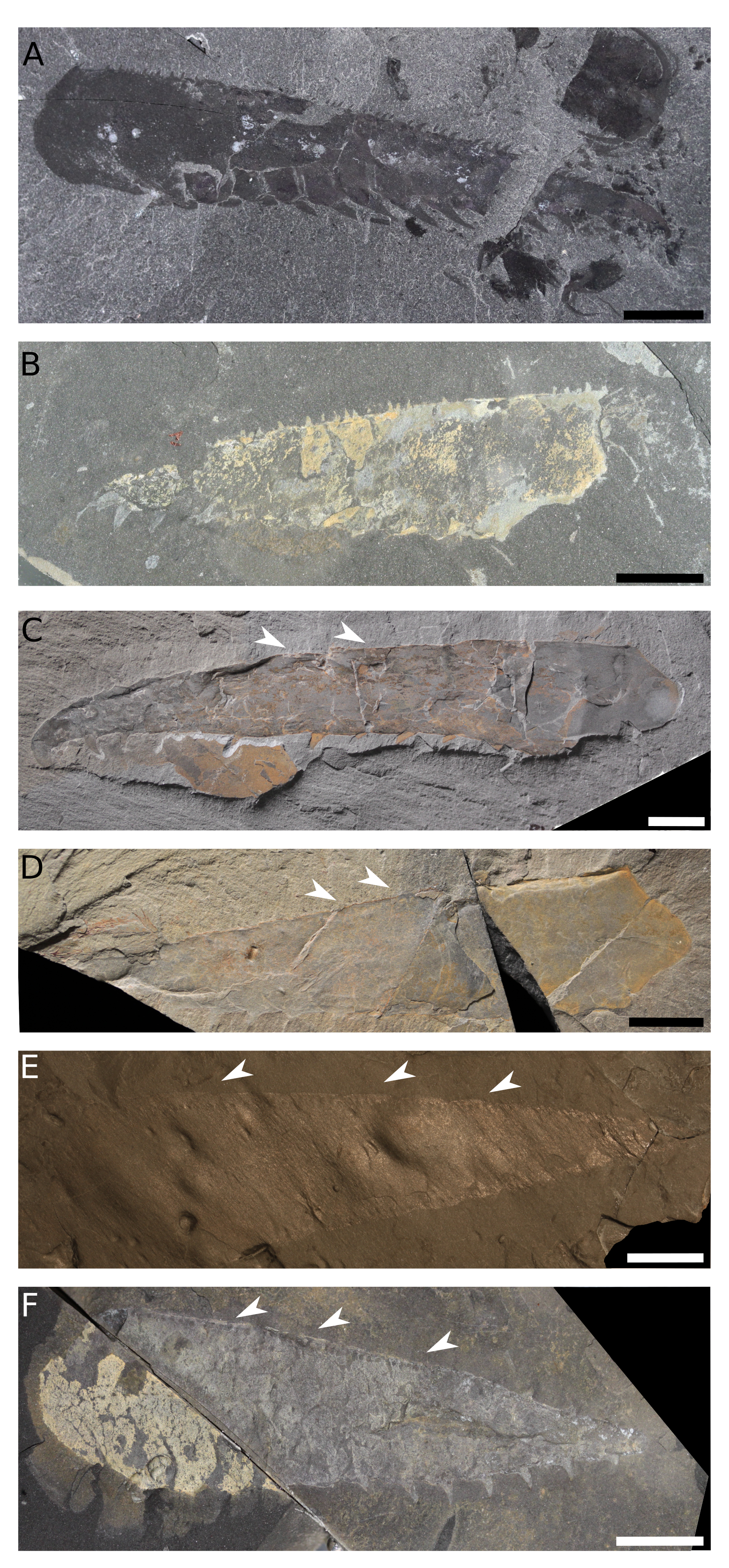
Fossil frontal appendages of C. serratus

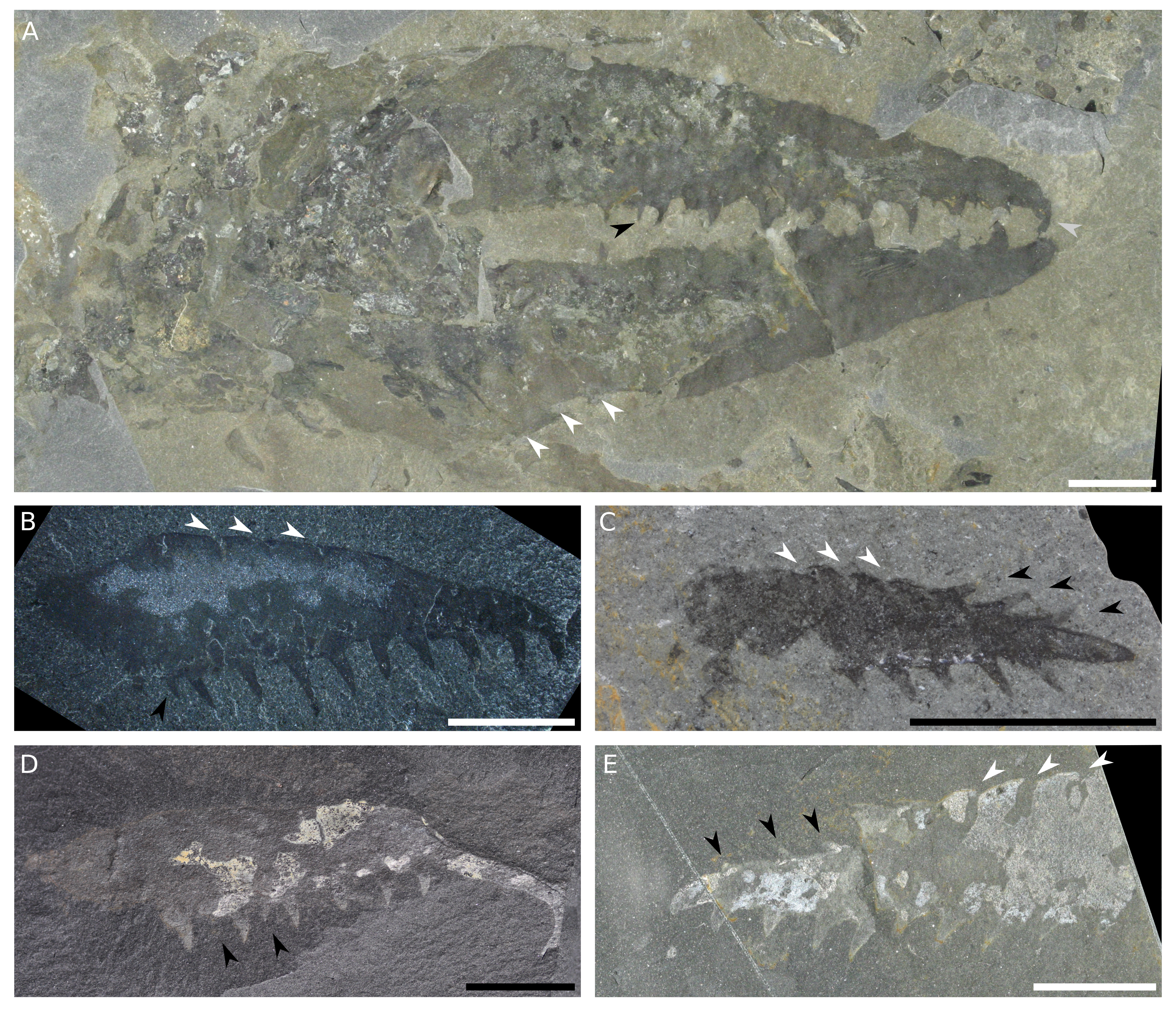
Fossil frontal appendages of C. camurus

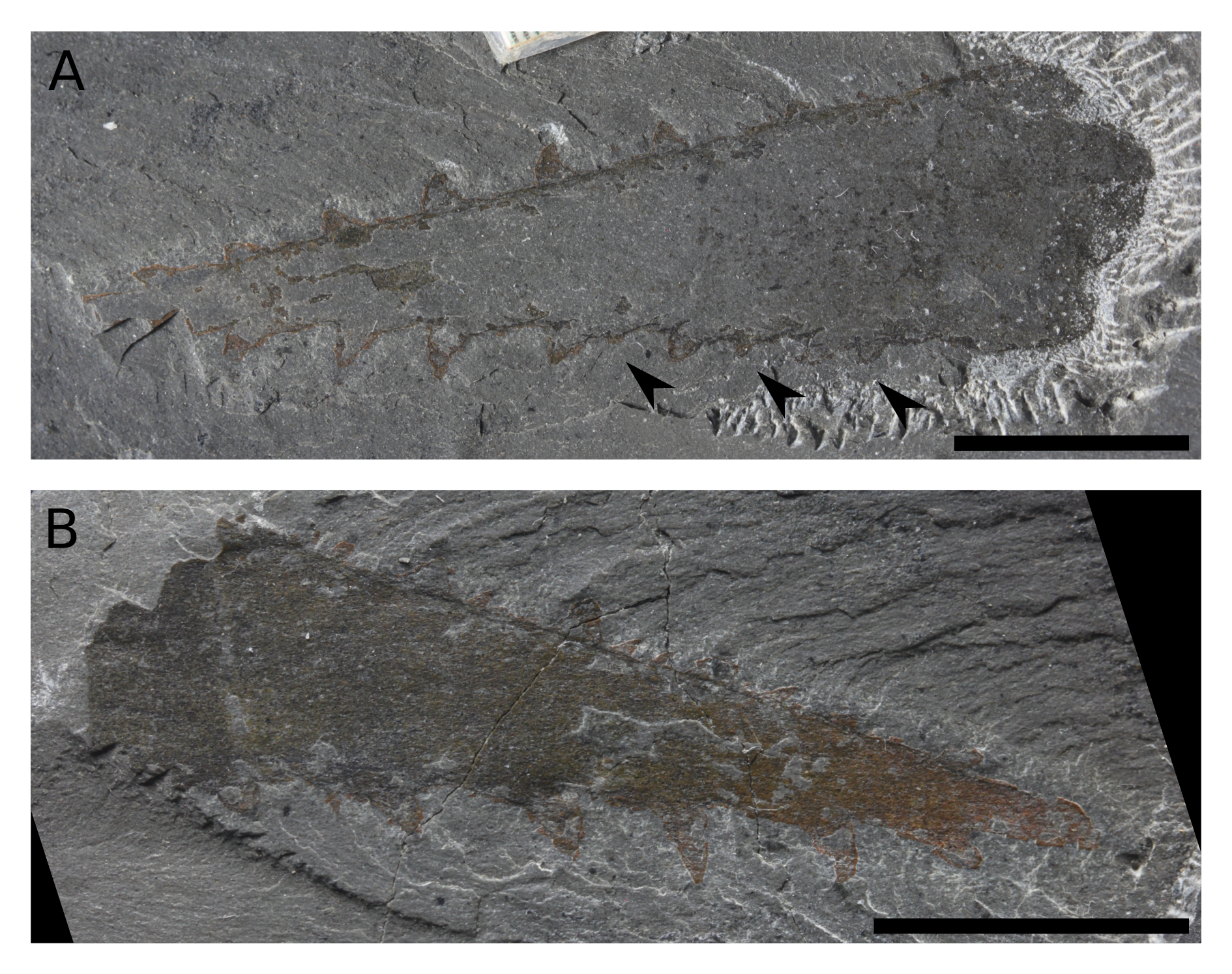
Fossil frontal appendages of C. durus

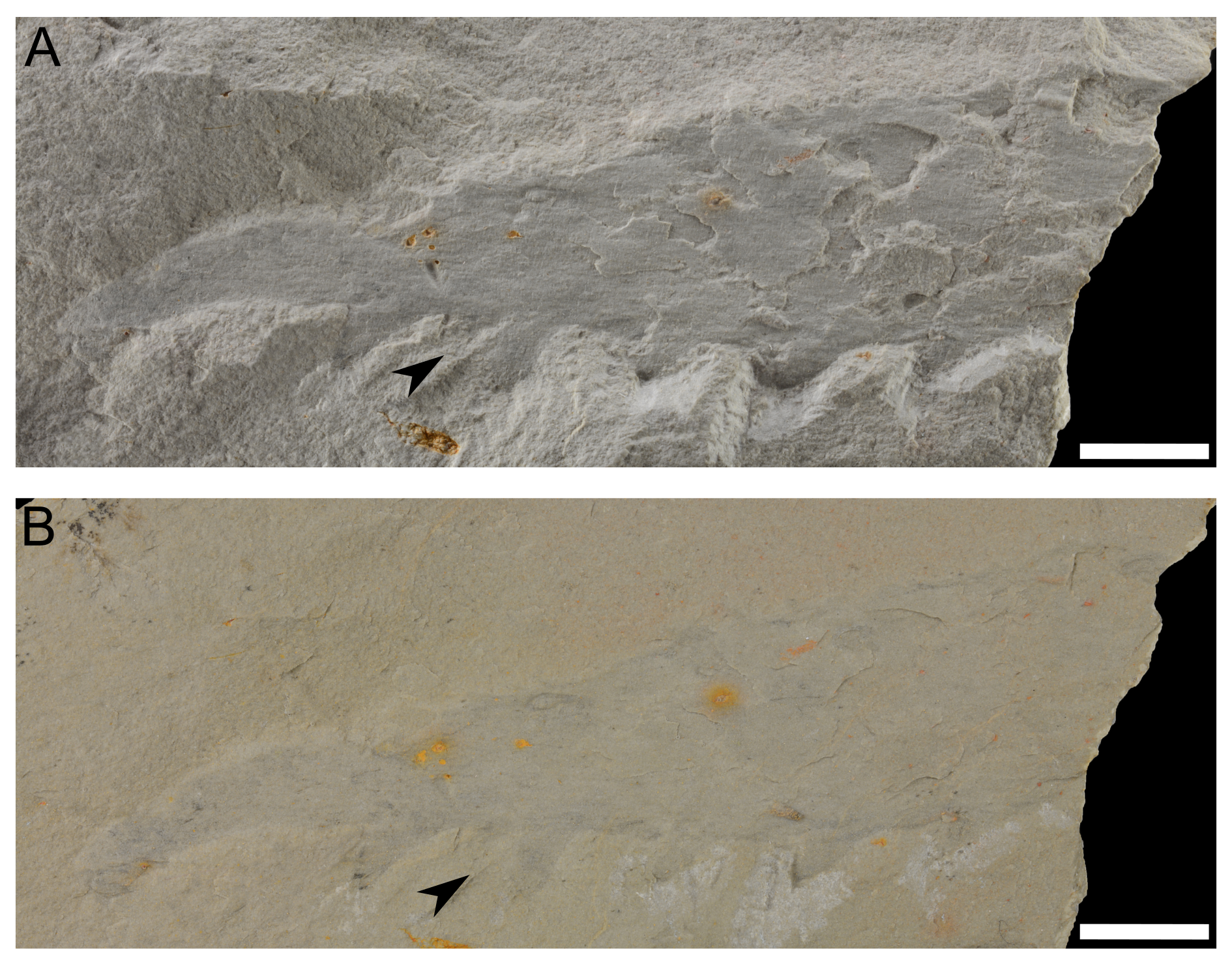
Fossil frontal appendage of C. cf. camurus (=Mureropodia apae)

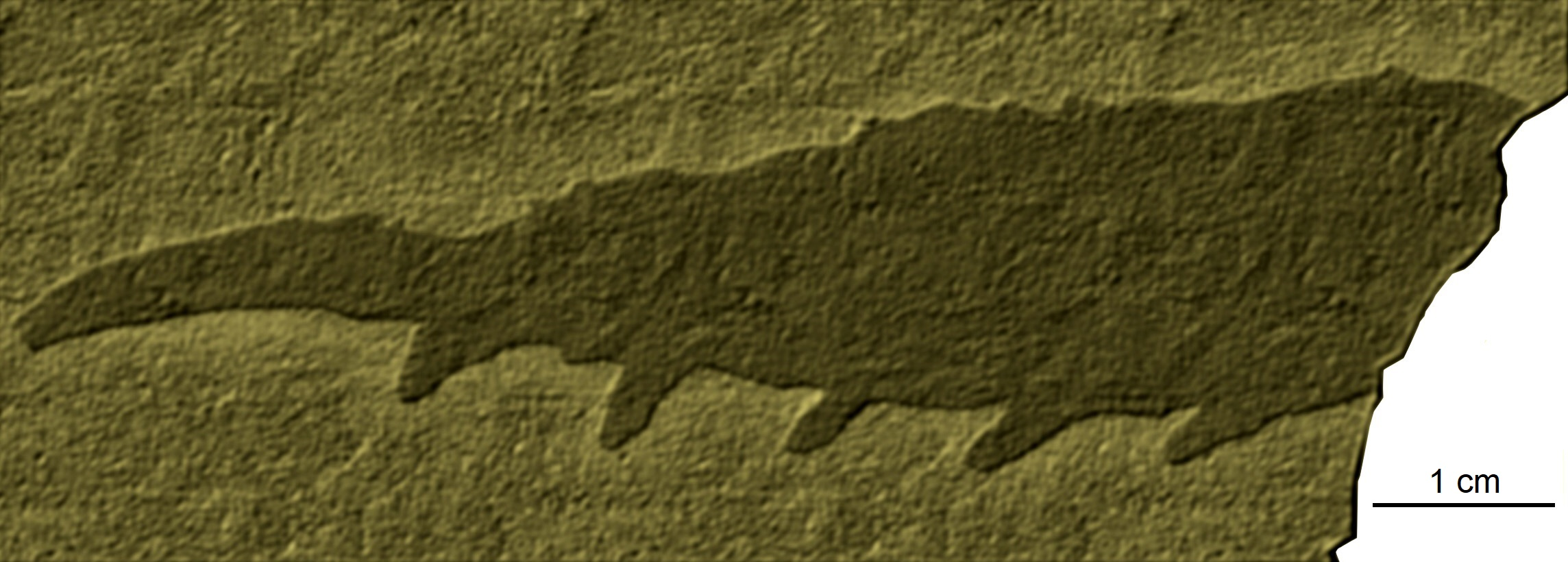
Digitally enhanced image of C. cf. camarus (=Mureropodia apae)

Presumed grasping motion of C. camurus

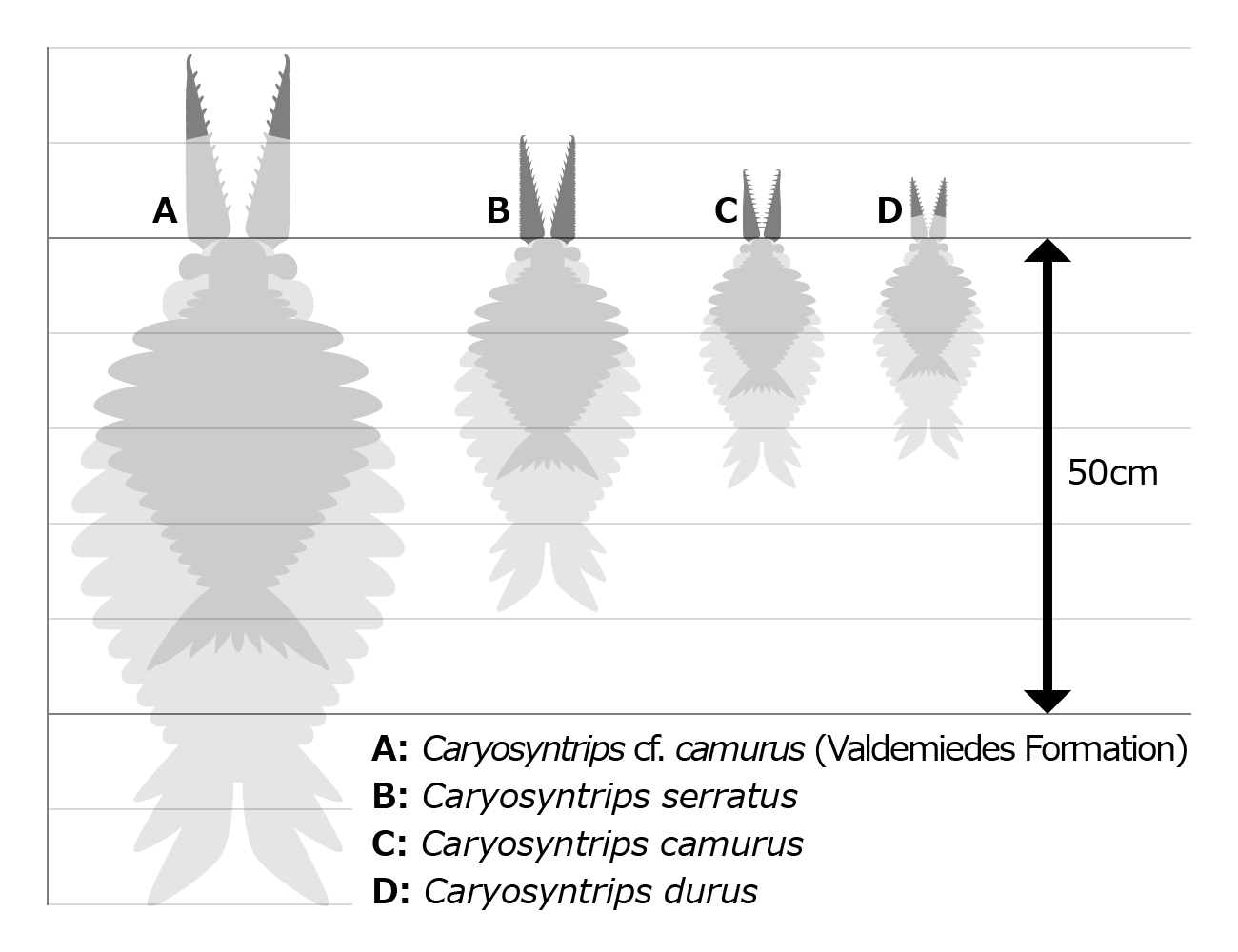
Sizes of various Caryosyntrips specimens, based on the interpretation as radiodonts.

Caryosyntrips is known only from its 14-segmented frontal appendages, which resemble nutcrackers, with the endite (ventral spine)-bearing margin facing each other, and the bell-shaped bases might represent movable articulations with the animal's head. Details of the endites, terminal spines, segmental boundaries and outer margins differ between species. It is thought to have used their frontal appendages in a scissor-like grasping or slicing motion, and were probably durophagous, feeding on hard-shelled organisms. Other structures remain unknown, although a specimen with paired appendages possibly contains fragmentary head sclerites as well.

The size of Caryosyntrips differed between each species. The largest species is C. serratus which is estimated around 20.5–30.2 cm (8.1–11.9 in) long. Other species are much smaller, with the body lengths of C. camurus and C. durus estimated up to 13.7–20.2 cm (5.4–8.0 in) and 12.2–17.9 cm (4.8–7.0 in) respectively. The largest possible specimen (MPZ 2009/1241), identified as C. cf. camurus, would have belonged to an individual measuring between 36.7–54 cm (1.20–1.77 ft) long.

== Taxonomic affinities ==
As of 2010s, Caryosyntrips was long considered to be a basal radiodont of uncertain position, usually resolved in a polytomy between euarthropod and radiodont branches. however more recent papers have found that it may sit outside of the monophyletic Radiodonta all together. Due to the unusual morphology of the frontal appendages and the limited extent of known remains, its position within the arthropod stem-group remains uncertain.

- Panarthropoda
  - Lobopodian grade (paraphyletic)
  - Onychophora
  - Tardigrada
  - total-group Euarthropoda
    - Siberiidae
    - - gilled lobopodians
      - - Caryosyntrips
        - other radiodonts
        - Euarthropoda

== See also ==
- Cucumericrus, another stem-arthropod with similar uncertainties.
