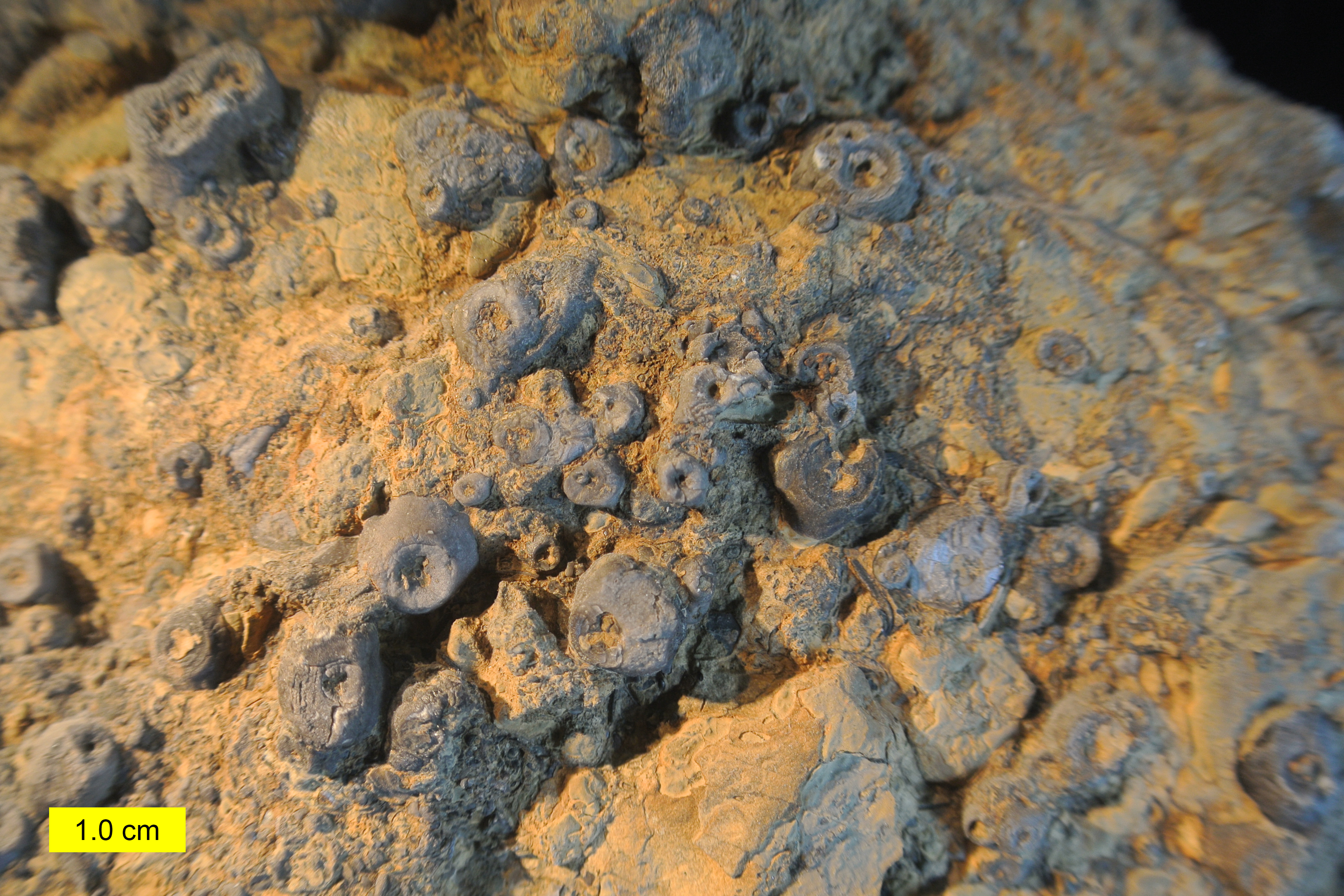
- Eocrinoid holdfasts (Middle Ordovician, Utah)
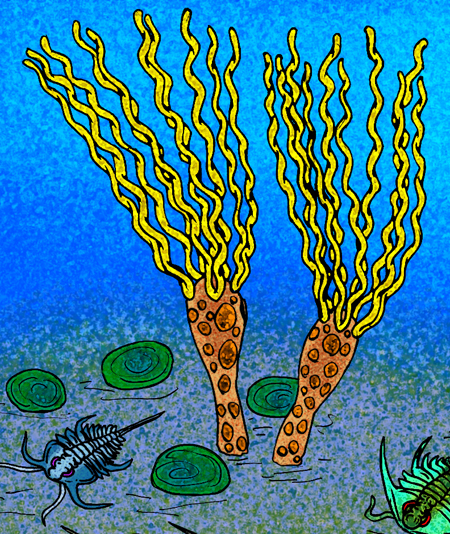
- Colourful reconstruction of Gogia ojenai

Scientific classification
- Kingdom: Animalia
- Phylum: Echinodermata
- Subphylum: †Blastozoa
- Class: †Eocrinoidea; Jaekel, 1899

Type genus
- †Eocrinus Jaekel 1918 (= †Gogia Walcott 1917)

Groups included
- †Ascocystitida; †Ascocystitidae; †Cambrocrinidae; †Rhopalocystidae; †Ridersiidae; †Gogiida; †Eocrinidae; †Lichenoididae; †Lyracystidae; †Thorntonitidae; †Turbanicystidae; †Imbricata; †Felbabkacystidae; †Lepidocystidae; †Trachelocrinida; †Heckerocrinidae; †Trachelocrinidae; †Ampheristocystidae; †Cryptocrinitidae; †Lingulocystidae; †Palaeocystitidae; †Rhipidocystidae; incertae sedis; †Cigara (?); †Haimacystis; †Ubaghsicystis

Cladistically included but traditionally excluded taxa
- †Rhombifera; †Diploporita; †Paracrinoidea; †Parablastoidea; †Blastoidea; †Coronoidea; Crinoidea (?)

= Eocrinoidea =

Eocrinoidea Temporal range: Cambrian Stage 3–Silurian

Class of echinoderms

The Eocrinoidea were an extinct class of echinoderms that lived between the Early Cambrian and Late Silurian periods. They are the earliest known group of stalked, brachiole-bearing echinoderms, and were the most common echinoderms during the Cambrian.

The earliest genera had a short holdfast and irregularly structured plates. Later forms had a fully developed stalk with regular rows of plates. They were benthic suspension feeders, with five ambulacra on the upper surface, surrounding the mouth and extending into a number of narrow arms.

== Phylogeny ==
Eocrinoids were a paraphyletic group that are seen as the basal stock from which all other blastozoan groups evolved.

=== Early evolution ===
The following cladogram, after Nardin et al. 2017 with slight modifications, shows the progression of early eocrinoid families, with all other eocrinoid families (including representatives Trachelocrinus and Ridersia) grouped with "derived Blastozoans" as their relationships with each other and with other blastozoans are not addressed.

- Lepidocystidae
  - Kinzercystis
  - Vyscystis
  - Lepidocystis
- - Felbabkacystidae
    Felbabkacystis
  - - Lyracystis
    - - - Akadocrinus
        - Gogia
        - Sinoeocrinus
        - Ubaghsicystis
      - - Lichenoides
        - - Trachelocrinus
          - Ridersia
          - (derived Blastozoa)

=== Relationships to other groups ===
Relationships among the eocrinidae and other blastozoan clades are an area of ongoing study. Below are two of many cladograms showing some aspect of eocrinoid paraphyly or polyphyly.

The following cladogram shows stalked Cambrian (and select Ordovician) echinoderms, after Zamora & Smith, 2011. All genera except those bracketed as "Crinoids" are blastozoans:

- - Kinzercystis
  - - - - Titanocrinus
        - Aethocrinus
      - Lyracystis
    - - Gogia
      - Sinoeocrinus
      - - Akadocrinus
        - - Tatonkacystis
          - Ubaghsicystis
          - - Dibrachicystis
            - Pleurocystites
            - - Velieuxicystis
              - - Macrocystella
                - Ridersia

This next cladogram, after Paul et al. 2024, shows several eocrinoids in a polytomy with a clade containing several other blastozoan groups:

- - - Akadocrinus
    - Cambrocrinus
  - Ridersia
  - Sanducystis
  - - - Cystobsastus
      - - Lepadocystis
        - - Echinoencrinites
          - - Cheirocystella
            - Macrocystella
    - - - Rhombifera
        - Lysocystites
        - - Macurdablastus
          - Codaster
        - Stephanocrinus
      - - Thomacystis
        - - Caryocrinites
          - Hemicosmites
