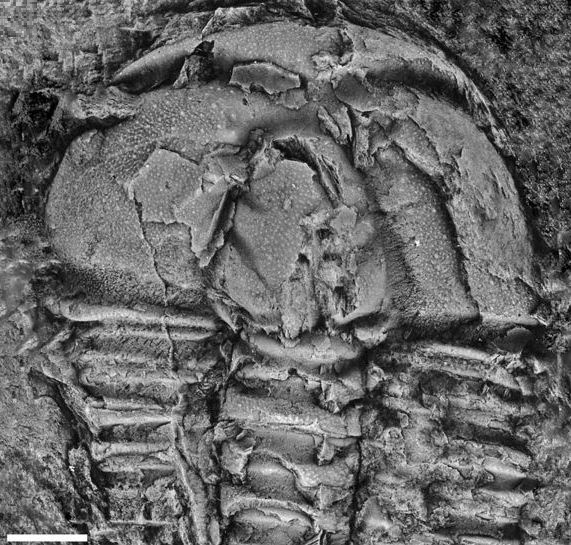
- Bailiaspis dalmani (Angelin, 1854), basal Whitesands Bay Formation, Porth-y-rhaw; cast of external mould of cephalon and incomplete thorax figured Salter & Hicks (1869, pl. 2, fig 8) as holotype of Conocoryphe bufo Hicks, and Lake (1940, pl. 40, figs 15, 16) as B. dalmani. Scale bar represents 5 mm.

Scientific classification
- Kingdom: Animalia
- Phylum: Arthropoda
- Clade: †Artiopoda
- Class: †Trilobita
- Order: †Ptychopariida
- Family: †Conocoryphidae
- Genus: †Bailiaspis; Resser, 1936

Species
- See text

= Bailiaspis =

Bailiaspis Temporal range: Middle Cambrian

Genus of trilobites

Bailiaspis is a Middle Cambrian (Miaolingian) trilobite genus belonging to the family Conocoryphidae. Within the Acado-Baltic region, the genus ranges from Wuliuan into Guzhangian age strata (Ptychagnostus gibbus to Lejopyge laevigata Biozones in terms of Scandinavian biostratigraphic terminology).

== Diagnosis ==
A genus of Conocoryphidae in which backward expansion of the anterior cranidial border and the border furrow arched sharply towards posterior (sag) combine to form a distinct medial 'plectrum'.

== Species ==
Type species: Conocephalites elegans Hartt in Dawson, 1868, by original designation. From the Middle Cambrian, Chamberlain's Brook Formation (Fossil Brook Member), Eccaparadoxides eteminicus Zone, of Saint John, New Brunswick.

other species

- B. dalmani (Angelin, 1854) [= Conocoryphe bufo Hicks, 1869].
- B. glabrata (Angelin, 1854) [= Holocephalina agrauloides Sdzuy, 1966, by ontogeny].
- B. nicholasi Resser, 1936, p. 14 [= B. glabrata according to Young et al. (1994, p. 354, fig. 9 g, k, n and ?m)].
- B. venusta Resser, 1937 [= B. prominens Resser, 1937, according to Kim et al., 2002, p. 830].
- B. inflata Lake, 1940
- B. tuberculata Lake, 1940
- B. cf. tuberculata Lake, 1940 and B. aff. tuberculata Lake, 1940
- B. latigenae Hutchinson, 1962
- B. griffei (Courtessole, 1967)
- B. menneri Korobov, 1973
- B. bobrovi Korobov, 1973
- B. jakutensis Korobov, 1973
- B. botomensis Korobov, 1973
- B. picta Korobov, 1973
- B. curta Korobov, 1973
- B. senonta Korobov, 1973

== Distribution ==
- B. dalmani (Angelin, 1854) occurs in Southern Sweden in the Exsulans Limestone and immediately adjacent shale layers at various locations (Scania: Brantevik and Gislövshammar; Kiviks-Esperöd; Andrarum; Fågelsång; also Borgholm on the island of Öland at the same stratigraphic horizon. Hicks collected 'Conocoryphe' bufo from the ' Paradoxides aurora Zone' near the base of the Whitesands Bay Formation (formerly 'Upper Solva Beds') and Ptychagnostus gibbus Biozone at Porth-y-rhaw, St David's, South West Wales (Rees et al., 2014). The Whitesands Bay Formation is conventionally referred to the biozone of Paradoxides aurora, following Hicks (1881). However, that species is a probable subjective junior synonym of Mawddachites hicksii, and so no independent aurora biozone can be recognized.
- B. glabrata (Angelin, 1854) [= Holocephalina agrauloides Sdzuy, 1966, and B. nicholasi Resser, 1936] was originally derived from the Zone of Solenopleura brachymetopa (Andrarum Limestone) of Andrarum, Scania and at the same horizon on the Danish island of Bornholm (Westergard, 1950, p. 31). The species also occurs in the Manuels River Formation, davidis Zone of Deep Cove, Cape St Mary's Peninsula, Newfoundland [Fletcher, 2007, p. 86, (fig. 56, p. 67)], in the Valtorres Formation (Guzhangian) at Purujosa, Iberian Chains, NE Spain (Álvarez et al. 2013), and in the lower part of the Jbel Lmgaysmat Formation in the central Anti-Atlas of Morocco. Westergård (1950, p. 31) noted that "An incomplete and somewhat distorted cranidium identified as Conocoryphe cf. dalmani by Nicholas (1916) and later described and illustrated by Lake (1940) under the name of Bailiaspis nicholasi Resser MS. (1936, p.14), seems to agree with glabrata", an opinion upheld by Young et al. (1994). The specimen was obtained from Nicholas's (1915) 'thin calcareous grit' that spans the junction of the Nant-y-big and Maentwrog Formations near Nant-y-big, Porth Ceiriad, North West Wales and the fauna indicates correlation with the Andrarum Limestone (Solenopleura brachymetopa and Lejopyge Laevigata biozones) of Andrarum, Scania, Sweden. Poorly preserved specimens assigned to Bailiaspis cf. glabrata have also been reported from the upper Languedocian strata of the Coulouma-Refescals sector of the southern Montagne Noire (Courtessole, Pillet & Vizcaïno, 1988; Álvaro & Vizcaïno, 1998).
- B. venusta Resser, 1937 [= B. prominens Resser, 1937, according to Kim et al., 2002, p. 830]. Collected from the Fossil Brook Member of the Chamberlain's Brook Formation, P. bennettii zone on Manuels River (Hutchinson, 1962, p. 101)
- B. inflata Lake, 1940. Comley Breccia Bed (Bb 1), = upper gibbus – fissus Biozones Comley, Shropshire, England (Rushton in Rushton et al. 2011, fig. 12, p. 32). Also recorded by Fletcher (2007, p. 67, pl. 34, fig. 30) from the Chamberlain's Brook Formation, Agraulos affinis Zone in Wester Cove of Branch, St. Mary's Bay, Newfoundland. Fletcher stated (p. 74), however, that "the species close to Bailiaspis inflata in this A. affinis faunal assemblage may indicate a slightly earlier occurrence than the type specimen" from Comley.
- B. tuberculata Lake, 1940. Recorded from Illing's (1916) level A4 in the Abbey Shale Formation of Nuneaton, Warwickshire, central England. Illing assigned his level A4 to the former Paradoxides aurora Zone (now abandoned) which has been correlated with some reserve to the Ptychagnostus gibbus Biozone (Rushton, 1979, 1999, 2011; Rees et al., 2014). B. cf. tuberculata, B. aff. tuberculata and B. sp. occur in the Mansilla Formation of the Iberian Chains, NE Spain and indicate a range from the Eccaparadoxides asturianus Zone (upper Leonian) to the lowermost Badulesia tenera Zone (lower Caesaraugustan), which correspond to the late Wuliuan ["upper part of Stage 5 of Cambrian Series 3"] and, probably, the lowermost Drumian Stages (Chirivella Martorell et al., 2017).
- B. latigenae Hutchinson, 1962 (Pl. 14, figures 7a, b, 8) was collected from a loose limestone nodule at only one beach locality in Deep Cove, St. Mary's Bay. The north and west shores of Deep Cove expose a section through Elliott Cove, Manuels River, and Chamberlain's Brook Formations and judging from the faunal association the nodule must have come from the hicksii, or the lowest part of the davidis zone within the Manuels River Formation.
- B. griffei (Courtessole, 1967) is from the Middle Cambrian La Gardie Formation, Point 13, Ferrals-les-Montagnes, Hérault, Languedoc-Roussillon, France
- B. menneri Korobov, 1973 is from the Middle Cambrian Olenek Formation of the Siberian Platform, Russia.
- B. bobrovi Korobov, 1973
- B. jakutensis Korobov, 1973
- B. botomensis Korobov, 1973
- B. picta Korobov, 1973
- B. curta Korobov, 1973
- B. senonta Korobov, 1973

== Notes ==
- B. dalmani is clearly closely related to the type species, B. elegans (Hartt in Dawson) from the E. eteminicus Zone of New Brunswick. The species was redescribed and reillustrated by Matthew (1885, p. 1 15, figs. 18 - 34) and by Kim et al. (2002, p. 831, Fig. 6, 8–10) and any apparent variance may in future prove attributable to preservation. However, a close comparison of further material is required to verify whether the Swedish form is actually a subjective senior synonym of elegans.
- Conocoryphe emarginata Linnarsson (Westergård, 1950, pl. 5, figs. 1–4) was originally assigned to Bailiaspis by Resser (1936, p. 19) but transferred to Bailiella Matthew, 1885, by Westergård (1936, p. 58).

Other species previously assigned to Bailiaspis and listed below have more recently been transferred by Kim et al. (2002, p. 830) to Bailiella Matthew, 1885:

- B. meridiana Sdzuy, 1958.
- B. howelli Hutchinson (1962, pl. 14, figs. 1 – 4).
- B. cf. howelli Hutchinson (1962, pl. 14, figs. 5 – 6).

Cladistic analyses of the Conocoryphidae by Cotton (2000, p. 193) gave strong evidence that Bailiaspis glabrata (Angelin, 1854) should also be assigned to the genus Bailiella, as tentatively suggested by Sdzuy (1966), although subsequent authors (e.g. Kim et al., 2002) have for now preferred to retain the species in Bailiaspis.

== See also ==
- List of trilobite genera
