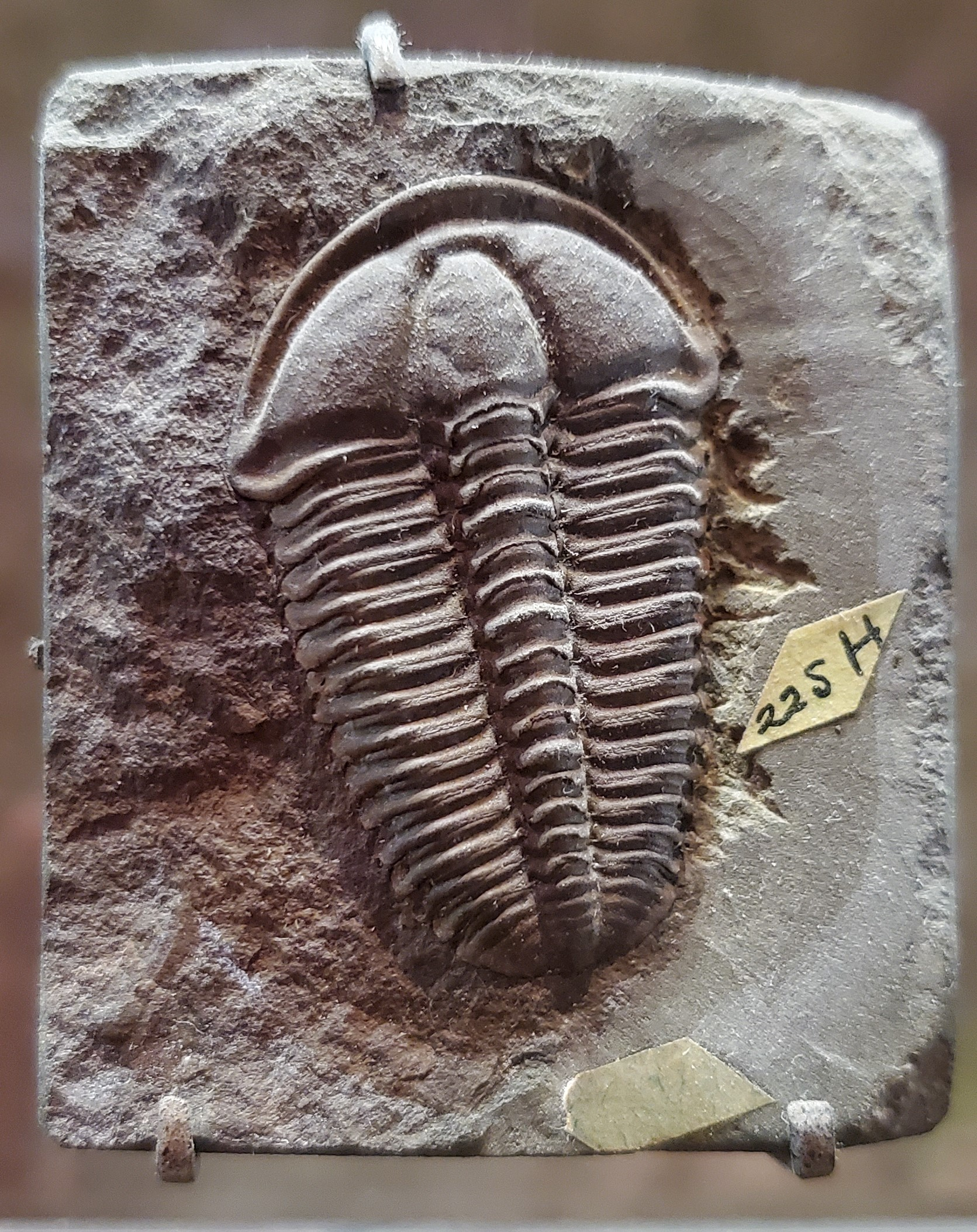
- Conocoryphe sulzeri fossil at the Smithinsonian

Scientific classification
- Kingdom: Animalia
- Phylum: Arthropoda
- Clade: †Artiopoda
- Class: †Trilobita
- Order: †Ptychopariida
- Suborder: †Ptychopariina
- Superfamily: †Ptychoparioidea
- Family: †Conocoryphidae; Angelin, 1854

= Conocoryphidae =

Conocoryphidae Temporal range: 513-478.6 MYA

Extinct family of trilobites

Conocoryphidae is a family of trilobites within the order Ptychopariida. Members of this family have been recorded from the Cambrian to early Ordivician from 513 to 478 MYA. Members of this family have been uncovered in the United States, Canada, China, Czech Republic, France, Greenland, Russia, Spain, Turkey, and the United Kingdom.

== Genera ==
- Bailiaspis Resser, 1936
- Bailiella Matthew, 1885
- Conocoryphe Hawle and Corda, 1847
- Ctenocephalus Hawle and Corda, 1847
- Elyx Brogger, 1879
- Hartella Matthew, 1885
- Holocephalina Salter, 1864
- Novocatharia Özdikmen, 2009
- Parabailiella Thoral, 1946
- Tchaiaspis Korobov, 1966
