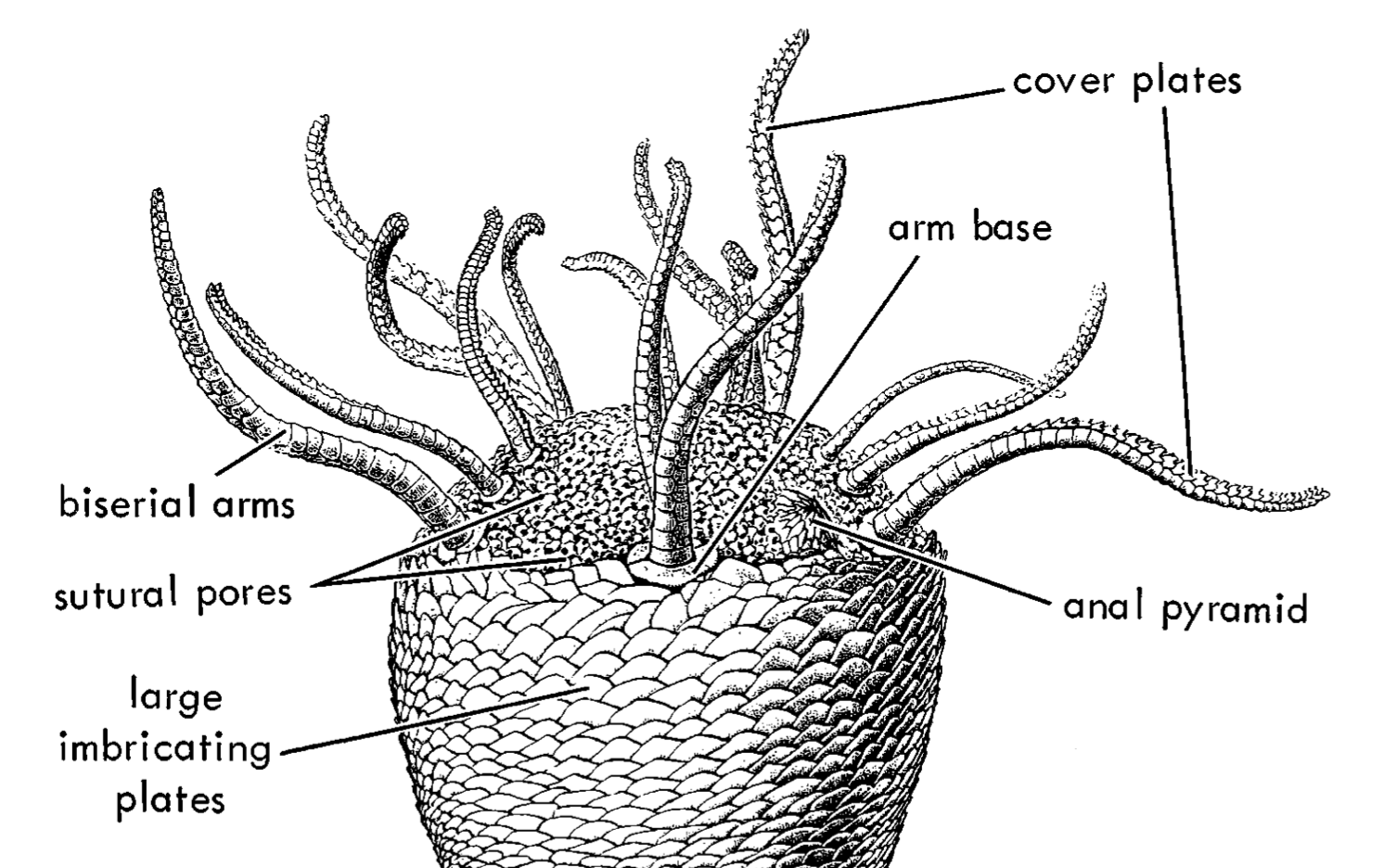
- A diagram of the upper portion of the echinoderm Lepidocystis

Scientific classification
- Kingdom: Animalia
- Phylum: Echinodermata
- Class: †Eocrinoidea
- Order: †Imbricata
- Family: †Lepidocystidae
- Genus: †Lepidocystis

= Lepidocystis =

Lepidocystis Temporal range: Cambrian Series 2

Extinct genus of echinoderms

Lepidocystis is a Palaeozoic genus of imbricate lepidocystoid eocrinoid, closely related to Kinzercystis. It bore a stalk, with which it attached to firm substrates; and brachioles arising as lateral branches from its arms.

It is only known from the late Botomian = Cambrian Series 2 Kinzers Formation.
