= Aethocrinus =

Aethocrinus Temporal range: Lower Ordovician

Scientific classification
- Kingdom: Animalia
- Phylum: Echinodermata
- Class: Crinoidea
- Family: †Aethocrinidae
- Genus: †Aethocrinus

Extinct genus of echinoderms

Aethocrinus is an early-diverging crinoid reported from the Early Ordovician. Its five arms bifurcate.

The contested Echmatocrinus notwithstanding, it is a candidate for the earliest true member of the crinoid class – though not being a member of the crown group, quite where within the stem group to draw the distinction between eocrinoids and crinoids is a somewhat arbitrary decision.
