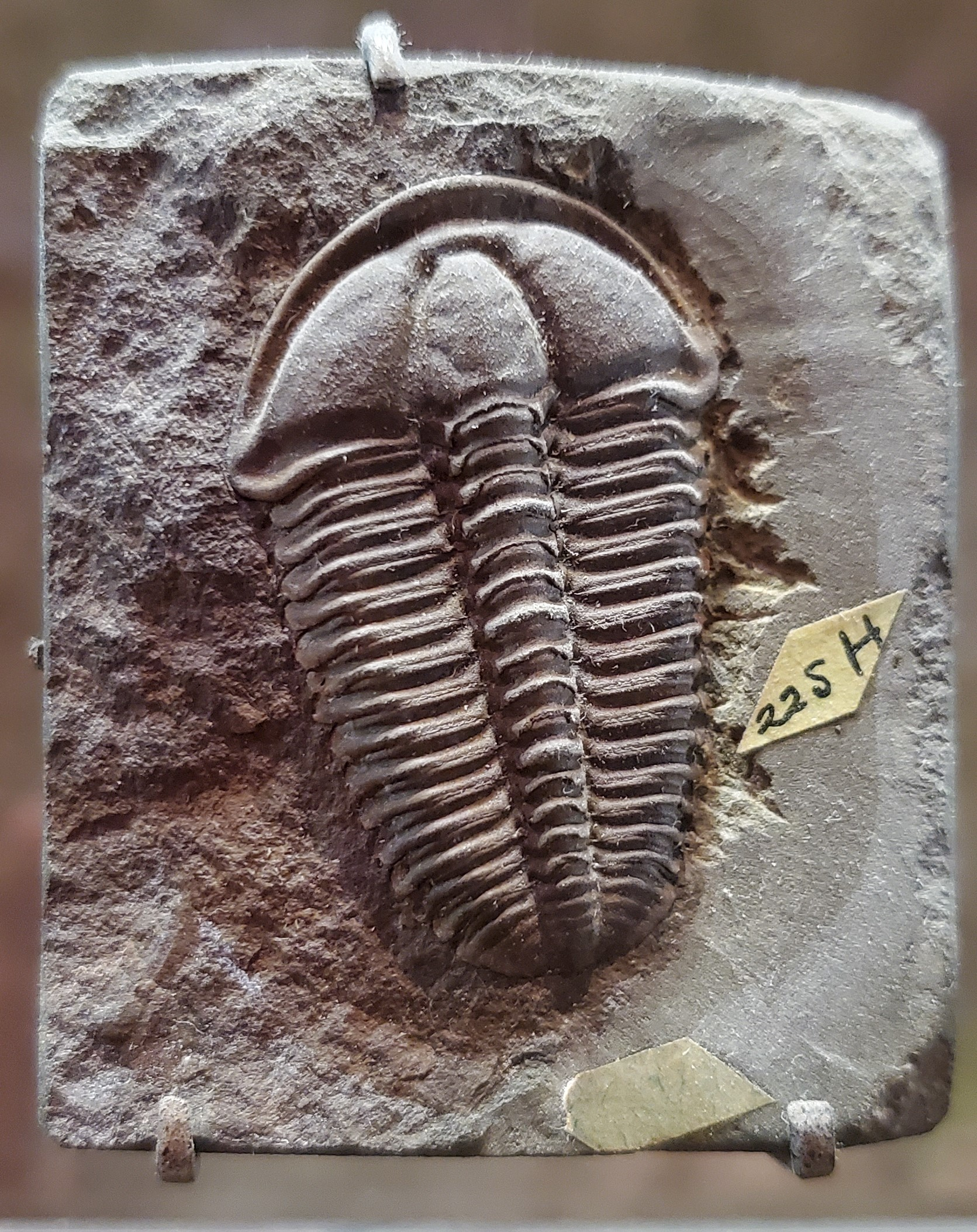
- Conocoryphe sulzeri

Scientific classification
- Kingdom: Animalia
- Phylum: Arthropoda
- Clade: †Artiopoda
- Class: †Trilobita
- Order: †Ptychopariida
- Family: †Conocoryphidae
- Genus: †Conocoryphe; Hawle & Corda, 1847

Species
- Conocoryphe sulzeri (Schlotheim, 1823) (Type) = Trilobites sulzeri, Conocephalites sulzeri; Conocoryphe cirina (Barrande, 1846) = C. sulzeri cirina, Conocephalites cirina; Conocoryphe gerlinda Snajdr, 1982; onocoryphe punctata; Conocoryphe caecigena Dean, 1982

Synonyms
- Conocephalus Zenker, 1833, non Thunberg, 1815 (conehead bushcricket); Conocephalites; Couloumania

= Conocoryphe =

Conocoryphe Temporal range: Middle Cambrian

Genus of trilobites

Conocoryphe is a genus of primarily eyeless trilobites belonging to the family Conocoryphidae. They lived during the Middle Cambrian period, about 505 million years ago. These arthropods lived on the sea bottom (epifaunal) and lived off dead particulate organic matter (a lifestyle called detritivorous).

== Distribution ==
Cambrian of the Czech Republic, France, Spain, Turkey, United States (Wisconsin).

== Taxonomy ==
Conocephalites Barrande, 1852 was introduced as a replacement for Conocephalus Zenker, 1833, which was unavailable since Thunberg (1815) had previously used the name for a genus of conehead bushcricket. Barrande, however, was unaware that Conocoryphe had already been proposed by Hawle and Corda in 1847.

== Type species ==
Trilobites sulzeri (Schlotheim, 1823 = Conocoryphe sulzeri sulzeri (Schlotheim, 1823); Conocoryphe latifrons Hawle & Corda, 1847

=== Reassigned species ===
Some species, that were describe as belonging to Conocoryphe have since been classified in other genera.

- C. kingii = Elrathia kingii
- C. rouayrouxi = Solenopleuropsis rouayrouxi
- C. salteri = Leptoplastides salteri

== Description ==
Conocoryphe is a rather flat trilobite of average size with an elongate oval outline. Overall shape of the cephalon is semicircular. The glabella tapers forward, is defined by deep axial furrows, and has three pairs of lateral furrows that are directed backward and inward and which do not connect across the midline. The glabella is separated from the anterior margin by a very conspicuous narrow convex preglabellar field that is lower than and does not reach the adjacent fixigenae. Occipital ring is distinct. Without eyes but for one known exception. Eye ridges (when present) are threadlike, evenly curved, extending from anterior corners of the glabella to the genal angles. Anterior cephalic border furrow is deep, concave and wider than the narrow convex border itself. The lateral cephalic border is divided longitudinally by a suture and extends into slender, backward-directed genal spines. Genal spines extend to the 4th thorax segment, but are often broken off, even in well preserved specimens. The hypostome is natant (or floating) i.e. not attached to the doublure and aligned with front edge of the glabella . The cephalic doublure and ventral sutures are not known. Thorax consists of 14 segments, with a rather narrow axis (of about 20% of the total width) that tapers evenly backwards. Deeply furrowed pleurae extend outward perpendicular to the axis and have rounded tips. Pygidium has 6 to 8 segments that are arched backward and become less well-defined towards posterior. The pygidium is semicircular in outline, its outer margin evenly curved, and it has a narrow, well-defined border. It is about half as wide as the cephalon (micropygous), and about half as long as wide.

=== Secondary sight ===
Conocoryphe provides a rare (but not unique) example of secondary eye development. Conocoryphids lack eyes except for Conocoryphe oculata. This species is otherwise very similar to its relatives from the Montagne Noir region in France. C. oculata has normal curving eye ridges, although the dorsal suture is marginal like in its blind family. Due to poor preservation, lenses have not been found. It seems that the expression of a gene for eye development was only suppressed and not lost, and the eye could develop when the suppression lifted.
