= Lyracystis =

Lyracystis Temporal range: Wuliuan

Scientific classification
- Kingdom: Animalia
- Phylum: Echinodermata
- Class: †Eocrinoidea
- Order: †Gogiida
- Family: †Lyracystidae
- Genus: †Lyracystis; Sprinkle & Collins 2006

Type species
- Gogia? radiata (pars) Sprinkle 1973

Species
- Lyracystis radiata (Sprinkle 1973); Lyracystis reesei Sprinklez & Collins 2006

Extinct genus of marine invertebrates

Lyracystis is an extinct genus of Cambrian eocrinoid echinoderm and the type genus of the gogiid family Lyracystidae. The type species, L. radiata, is known from several specimens from the Burgess Shale of British Columbia, while L. reesei is known from a single specimen from the slightly younger Spence Shale of Utah.

== Description ==
Lyracystis radiata is among the largest echinoderms known from the Middle Cambrian. The multiplated stalk of Lyracystis could reach over 11 cm in length, making it one of the highest-level suspension-feeding echinoderms of its time. The total length including stalk and feeding appendages likely exceeded 21cm in the largest individuals. Aside from the length, most stalk and theca features, such as epispires for respiration, are typical of Early to Middle Cambrian eocrinoids.

The feeding appendages of Lyracystis are its most dramatic feature, with three ambulacra (A, shared BC, and shared DE) extending to the edge of the oral surface of the theca before branching into two exothecal trunks forming a heart- or lyre-shaped structure with endotomously branching brachioles growing vertically from the trunks. Unlike in most echinoderms where the BC ambulacrum divides into B and C, and the DE into D and E, resulting in a total of five ambulacra, the A ambulacrum also divides, producing tri-radial ambulacral symmetry with three pairs of exothecal trunks. These trunks were at least 45mm long in larger specimens.

Notably, these appendages are not considered "arms" in the sense of crinoid arms, as they are not homologous to crinoid appendages. A comparison of Lyracystis appendages to crinoid arms noted that the morphology of contemporary crinoid arms was quite different, with only much later (Ordovician) taxa having superficial similarities to Lyracystis.

== Classification ==
Lyracystis is a member of the Lyracystidae, a family defined by the long stalks and distinctive feeding appendage morphology shared by Lyracystis and the family's only other member, Balangiocystis.

It is assigned to the order Gogiida based on the presence of epispires. A 2017 phylogenetic analysis recovered Lyracystis as more basal within the Gogiida than the families Eocrinidae and Lichenoididae.

Lyracystis radiata was originally identified as Gogia? radiata as the first fossils collected included only the theca and stalk, with the feeding appendages collected separately and described as the "Burgess Shale 'Arms.'" The discovery of Lyracystis reesei confirmed that the "arms" matched the theca and stalk of the type specimen of Gogia? radiata, leading to its reassignment to Lyracystis. This connection was further confirmed by the discovery of additional L. radiata specimens. Some other Gogia? radiata specimens were determined to be an actual Gogia species, now named G. stephenensis.
