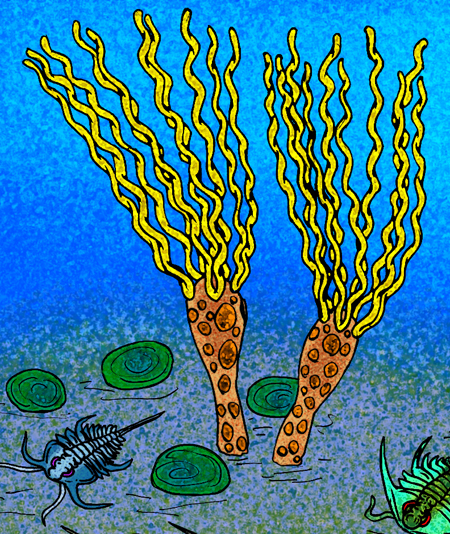
- Gogia ojenai

Scientific classification
- Kingdom: Animalia
- Phylum: Echinodermata
- Class: †Eocrinoidea
- Order: †Gogiida
- Family: †Eocrinidae; Jaekel 1918

Type genus
- †Eocrinus Jaekel 1918 (= †Gogia Walcott 1917)

Genera
- †Gogia Walcott 1917; †Acanthocystites Barrande 1887; †Akadocrinus Prokop 1962; †Alanisicystis Ubaghs & Vizcaino 1990; †Archaeocystites Barrande 1887; †Globoeocrinus Zhao, Parsley & Jin 2008; †Guizhoueocrinus Zhao, Parsley & Jin 2007; †Sinoeocrinus Zhao, Huang & Gong, 1994

= Eocrinidae =

Eocrinidae Temporal range: late Early Cambrian–Middle Cambrian

Extinct family of marine invertebrates

The Eocrinidae are a family of early echinoderms that contain the genus Gogia.
