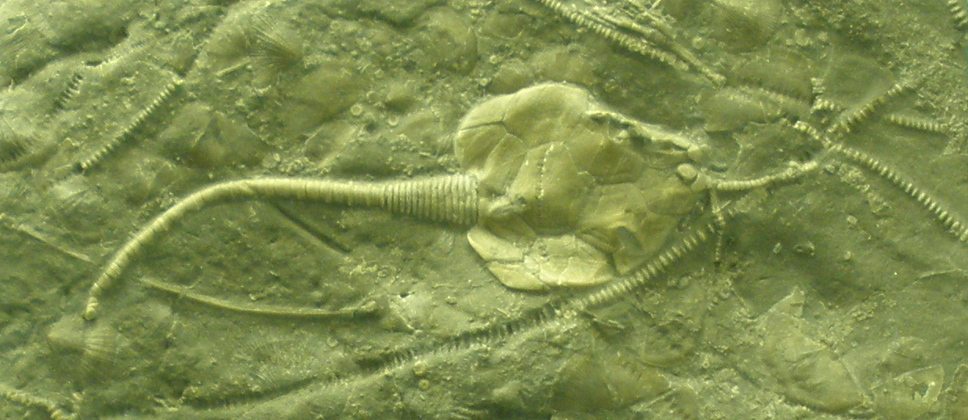
- Pleurocystites squamosus

Scientific classification
- Kingdom: Animalia
- Phylum: Echinodermata
- Informal group: †Rhombifera
- Order: †Dichoporita
- Superfamily: †Glyptocystitida
- Family: †Pleurocystitidae
- Genus: †Pleurocystites

= Pleurocystites =

Pleurocystites Temporal range: Late Ordovician

Genus of echinoderms (fossil)

Pleurocystites (meaning rib bag or side bladder) is a genus of rhombiferan echinoderm (a cystoid) that lived in the Late Ordovician. Its fossils are known from Europe and North America. Pleurocystites grew to a height of 2 centimeters (3/4 of an inch) and fed on plankton.

== Sources ==
- Fossils (Smithsonian Handbooks) by David Ward (Page 191)
- Parker, Steve. Dinosaurus: the complete guide to dinosaurs. Firefly Books Inc, 2003. Pg. 75
