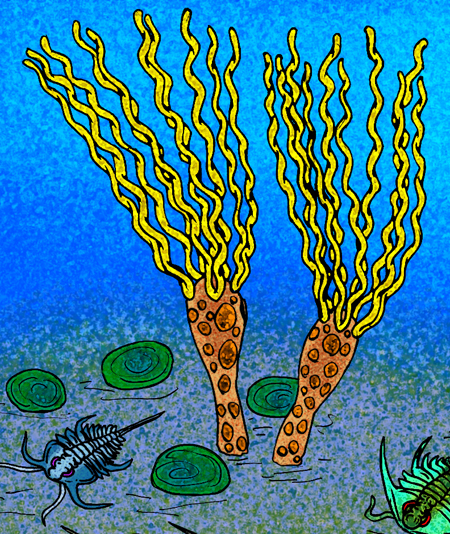
- Gogia ojenai

Scientific classification
- Kingdom: Animalia
- Phylum: Echinodermata
- Class: †Eocrinoidea
- Order: †Gogiida; Broadhead 1982

Type genus
- †Gogia Walcott 1917 (= †Eocrinus Jaekel 1918)

Families and genera
- †Eocrinidae Jaekel 1918; †Lichenoididae Barrande 1846; †Lyracystidae Sprinkle & Collins 2006; †Thorntonitidae Jell & Sprinkle 2021; †Turbanicystidae Parsley & Zhao 2010; incertae sedis; †Wudingeocrinus Luo et al. 2008

= Gogiida =

Gogiida Temporal range: late Early Cambrian–Middle Cambrian

Extinct order of marine invertebrates

The Gogiida are an order of early echinoderms known from late Early to Middle Cambrian deposits.
