= Ubaghsicystis =

Ubaghsicystis Temporal range: Wuliuan
- Silhouette of Ubaghsicysts

Scientific classification
- Kingdom: Animalia
- Phylum: Echinodermata
- Class: †Eocrinoidea
- Genus: †Ubaghsicystis; Gil Cid & Domínguez Alonso, 2002

Type species
- †U. segurae Gil Cid & Domínguez Alonso, 2002

Genus of eocrinoid

Ubaghsicystis is a genus of eocrinoid known from a single specimen each from the Barrios de Luna shales of Spain, the Burgess Shale of British Columbia,, and the Tarhoucht Member of the Jbel Wawrmast Formation of Morocco, all from the Wuliuan (Stage 5) of the Middle Cambrian.

== Etymology ==
The name of Ubaghsicystis honors paleontologist Georges Ubaghs for his work on Paleozoic echinoderms, particularly in Spain, where the first specimen was found.

== Description ==
Ubaghsicystis has a globular theca, or body, that is taller than it is wide, with a columnar stem. The plating of the theca forms more regular circles towards the stem, becoming more irregular towards the oral region. Epispires are present on the upper portion of the theca, but not the lower. Two feeding appendages are known, with a gradual transition from the theca rather than the sort of distinct insertion seen in eocrinoids such as Gogia.

While not a flattened eocrinoid itself, Ubaghsicystis is the earliest known eocrinoid to show a reduction to only two ambulacra. Its feeding appendages represent undivided BC and DE rays. The anal pyramid, typically found between the C and D rays, is on the right side of the theca.

As of the time of its description in 2015, the Burgess Shale specimen of Ubaghsicystis is the earliest known Laurentian eocrinoid with a holomeric stem.
