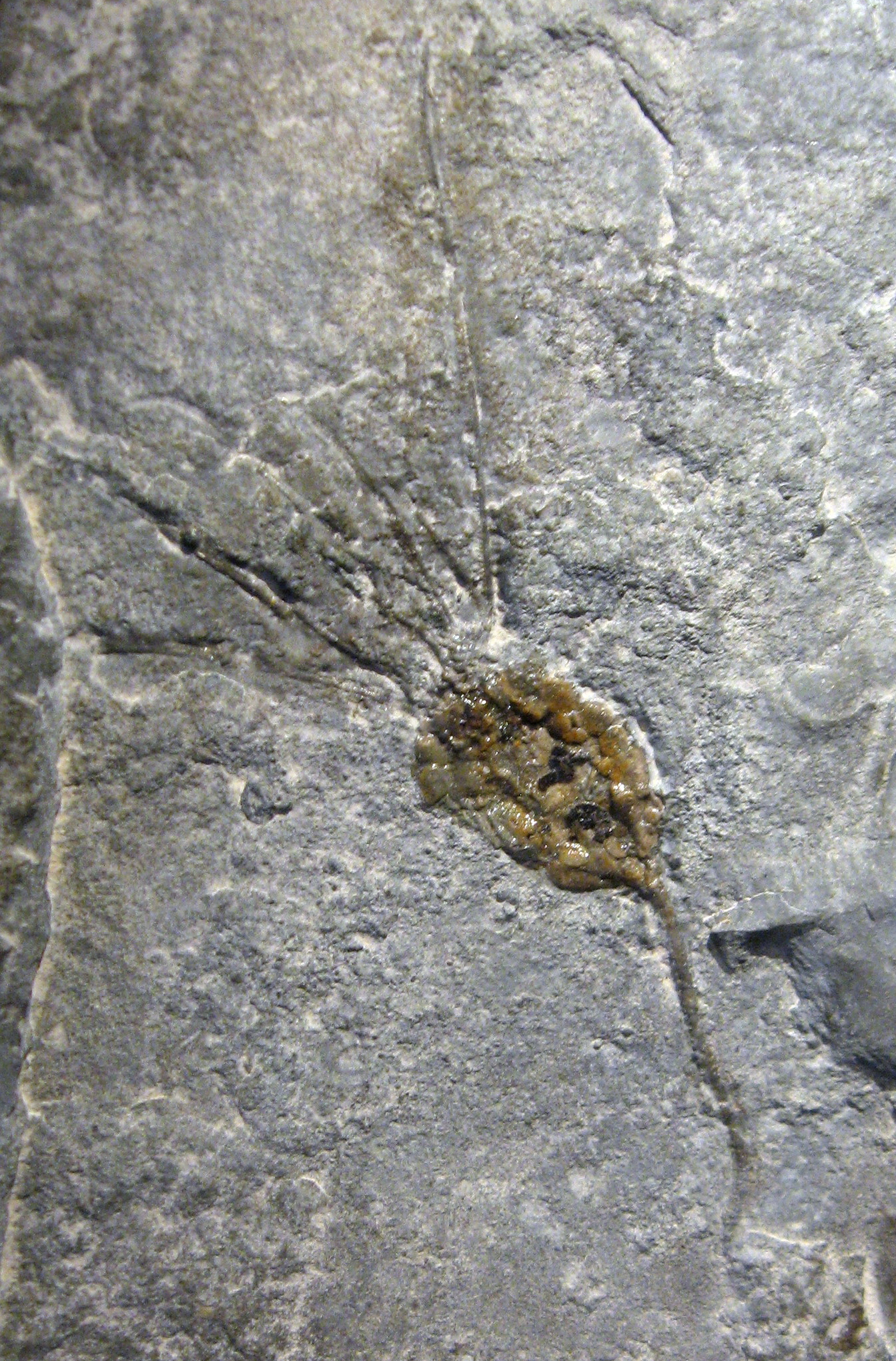
- G. kitchnerensis specimen from Utah

Scientific classification
- Kingdom: Animalia
- Phylum: Echinodermata
- Class: †Eocrinoidea
- Order: †Gogiida
- Family: †Eocrinidae
- Genus: †Gogia; Walcott 1917

Type species
- †G. prolifica

Species
- G. prolifica Walcott 1917; G. (Eocrinus) longidactylus (Walcott, 1886); G. granulosa Robison 1965; G. multibrachiata (Kirk, 1945); G. spiralis Robison, 1965; G. ojenai Durham, 1978

Synonyms
- Eocrinus

= Gogia =

Gogia Temporal range: Late Early Cambrian–Middle Cambrian

Extinct genus of marine invertebrates

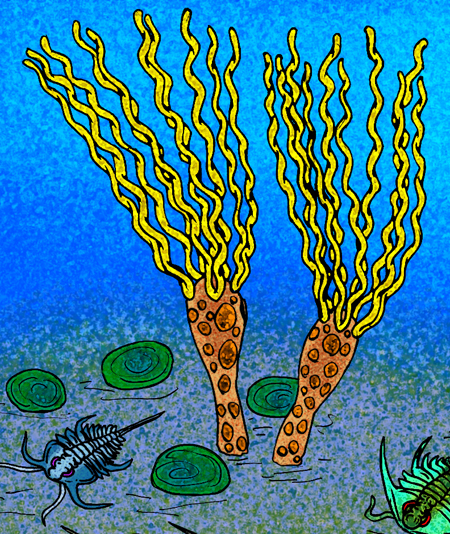
Artists reconstruction of G. ojenai

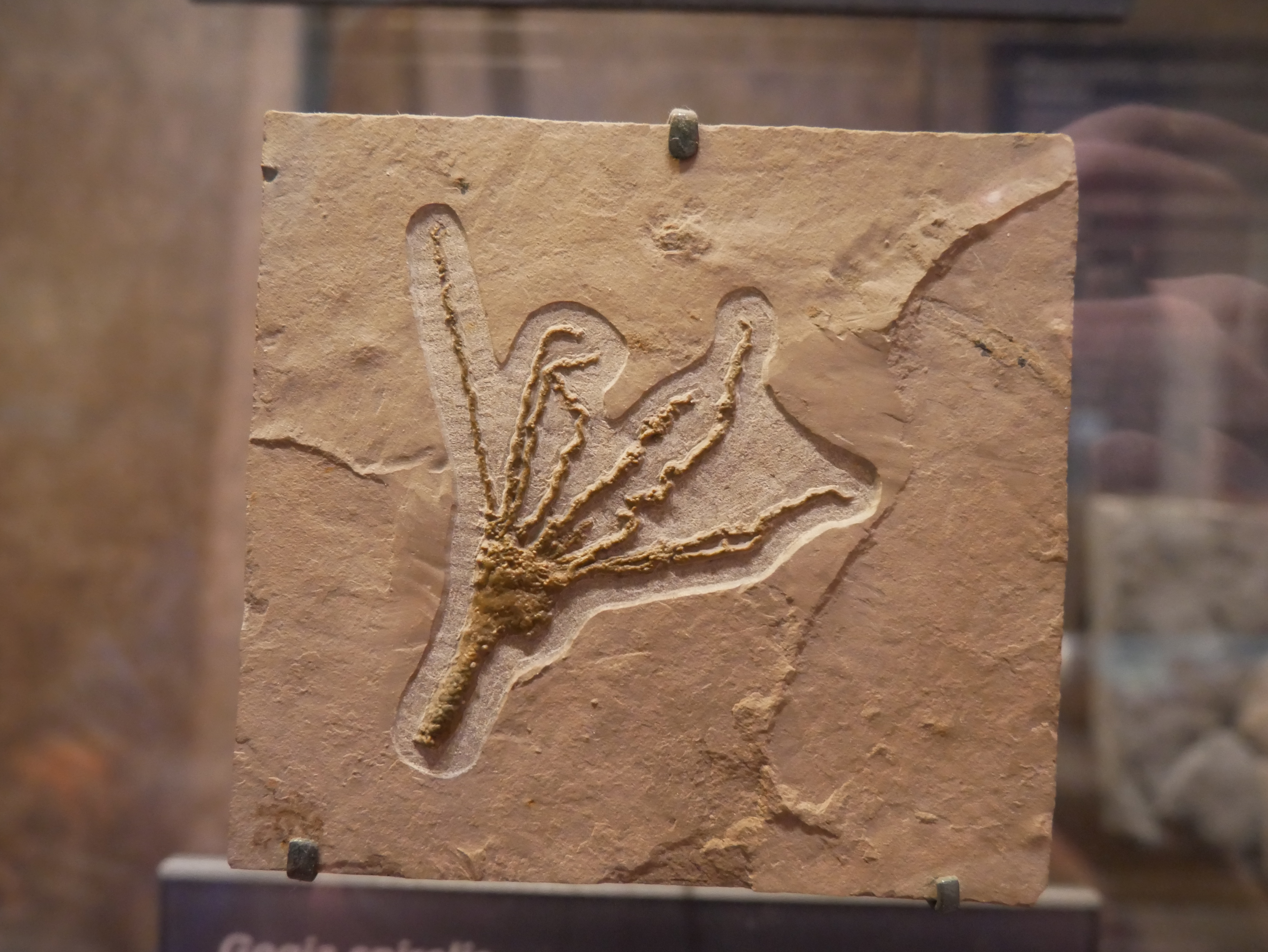
Gogia spiralis

Gogia is a genus of primitive eocrinoid blastozoan from the early to middle Cambrian.

G. ojenai dates to the late Early Cambrian; other species come from various Middle Cambrian strata throughout North America, but the genus has yet to be described outside this continent. Notable localities where species are found include the Wheeler Shale of Utah, and the Burgess Shale of British Columbia.

The species of Gogia, like other eocrinoids, were not closely related to the true crinoids, instead, being more closely related to the blastoids.

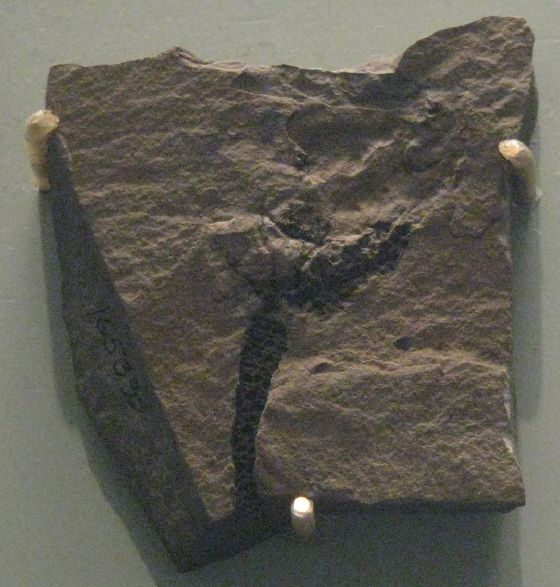
Gogia radiata

Gogia is distinguished from sea lilies, and most other blastoids, in that the plate-covered body was shaped like a vase, or a bowling pin (with the pin part stuck into the substrate), and that the five ambulacra were split into pairs of coiled or straight, ribbon-like strands. Six specimens of Gogia are known from the Greater Phyllopod bed, where they comprise < 0.1% of the community.

As a whole, the Eocrinoids are regarded as basal blastozoans very close to the ancestry of the entire subphylum.
