= 2014 in echinoderm paleontology =

This list of fossil echinoderms described in 2014 is a list of new taxa of echinoderms of every kind that have been described during the year 2014. The list only includes taxa at the level of genus or species.

Name	Novelty	Status	Authors	Age	Unit	Location	Notes	Images
Absurdaster	Gen. et 2 sp. et comb. nov	Valid	Kroh, Lukeneder & Gallemí	Early Cretaceous (Berriasian to Barremian)	Bersek Marl Formation; Puez Formation	Hungary; Italy; Switzerland	A collyritid atelostomate. Genus contains two new species: Absurdaster puezensis and Absurdaster hungaricus, as well as "Collyrites" meriani Ooster (1865).	
Acanthospondylus	Gen. et sp. nov	Valid	Harper	Carboniferous (late Pennsylvanian)	Conemaugh Group	United States	An eospondylid oegophiurid brittle star. The type species is Acanthospondylus pennsylvanicus.	
Aesiocrinus profundus	Sp. nov	Valid	Villanueva-Olea & Sour-Tovar	Carboniferous (Pennsylvanian)	Ixtaltepec Formation	Mexico	A poteriocrinidan cladid crinoid, a species of Aesiocrinus.	
Andymetra donovani	Sp. nov	Valid	Hess	Late Jurassic (Oxfordian)		France	A comatulid crinoid, a species of Andymetra.	
Apiocrinites feldmani	Sp. nov	Valid	Wilson, Reinthal & Ausich	Middle Jurassic (late Callovian)	Matmor Formation	Israel	A crinoid, a species of Apiocrinites.	
Balanocrinus brachiospina	Sp. nov	Valid	Hess	Late Jurassic (Oxfordian)		France	An isocrinid crinoid, a species of Balanocrinus.	
Bathysalenia skylari	Sp. nov	Valid	Jagt, Jackson & van der Ham	Late Cretaceous (late Turonian)		United States	A salenioid, a species of Bathysalenia.	
Bohnerticrinus	Gen. et sp. nov	Valid	Bohatý, Hein & Webster	Devonian (late Eifelian)	Freilingen Formation	Germany	A monobathrid camerate crinoid. The type species is Bohnerticrinus nilsjungi.	
Botryocrinus meloi	Sp. nov	Valid	Scheffler, Fernandes & da Fonseca	Devonian	Ererê Formation	Brazil	A crinoid, a species of Botryocrinus.	
Caenopedina aleksandrabitnerae	Sp. nov	Valid	Kroh	Oligocene	Polonez Cove Formation	Antarctica	A pedinid sea urchin, a species of Caenopedina.	
Cambroblastus guolensis	Sp. nov	Valid	Zhu, Zamora & Lefebvre	Late Cambrian (Furongian)	Sandu Formation	China	An edrioasteroid, a species of Cambroblastus.	
Cruxopadia	Gen. et 2 sp. nov	Valid	Reich in Reich & Ansorge	Late Jurassic (early Oxfordian) to Late Cretaceous (late Santonian)		France; Spain	A sea cucumber, probably a stem-molpadiid. The type species is Cruxopadia mesozoica from the early Oxfordian of Normandy, France; genus also contains Cruxopadia reitneri from the late Santonian of Catalonia.	
Ekteinocrinus mixteca	Sp. nov	Valid	Villanueva-Olea & Sour-Tovar	Carboniferous (Pennsylvanian)	Ixtaltepec Formation	Mexico	A dendrocrinidan cladid crinoid, a species of Ekteinocrinus.	
Eoleptosynapta	Gen. et sp. nov	Valid	Reich in Reich & Ansorge	Late Cretaceous (late Santonian)		Spain	A probably a stem-leptosynaptine synaptid sea cucumber. The type species is Eoleptosynapta jaumei.	
Eorynkatorpa	Gen. et sp. nov	Valid	Reich in Reich & Ansorge	Late Cretaceous (late Santonian)		Spain	A rynkatorpine synaptid sea cucumber. The type species is Eorynkatorpa catalonica.	
Hexawacrinus	Gen. et sp. nov	Valid	Frey et al.	Early Devonian (Pragian)		Morocco	A hexacrinitid monobathrid crinoid. The type species is Hexawacrinus claudiakurtae.	
Hydriocrinus amplus	Sp. nov	Valid	Villanueva-Olea & Sour-Tovar	Carboniferous (Pennsylvanian)	Ixtaltepec Formation	Mexico	A poteriocrinidan cladid crinoid, a species of Hydriocrinus.	
Hylodecrinus cymrus	Sp. nov	Valid	Howells & Kammer	Carboniferous (Mississippian)		United Kingdom	A cladid crinoid, a species of Hylodecrinus.	
Infulaster navicularis	Sp. nov	Valid	Dieni & Kroh	Late Cretaceous (Coniacian)		Italy	A cardiasterid heart urchin, a species of Infulaster.	
Jingxieocrinus	Gen. et sp. nov	Valid	Chen & Han	Cambrian (Furongian)	Guole Formation	China	An eocrinoid. The type species is Jingxieocrinus guoleensis.	
Leptosalenia barredai	Sp. nov	Valid	Forner	Early Cretaceous (Albian)		Spain	A sea urchin belonging to the order Salenioida and the family Saleniidae.	
Linguaserra franzenae	Sp. nov	Valid	Reich & Kutscher	Early Silurian		Sweden	A linguaserrid ophiocistioid, a species of Linguaserra.	
Maydena	Gen. et sp. nov	Junior homonym	Jell	Ordovician (Tremadocian)	Florentine Valley Formation	Australia	A brittle star of uncertain phylogenetic placement. The type species is M. roadsidensis. The generic name is preoccupied by Maydena Chandler (2001).	
Micropedina simplex	Sp. nov	Valid	Abdelhamid	Late Cretaceous (late Cenomanian)	Galala Formation	Egypt	A member of Pedinoida, a species of Micropedina.	
Omanaster	Gen. et sp. nov	Valid	Blake, Angiolini & Tintori	Early Permian (Sakmarian)	Saiwan Formation	Oman	A starfish. The type species is Omanaster imbricatus.	
Ophiocamax ventosa	Sp. nov	Valid	Jagt et al.	Middle Miocene	Grand Bay Formation	Grenada (Carriacou Island)	A brittle star, a species of Ophiocamax.	
Ophiodoris holterhoffi	Sp. nov	Valid	Thuy et al.	Early Cretaceous (late Aptian)	Glen Rose Formation	United States	An ophionereidid brittle star, a species of Ophiodoris.	
Ophioleuce sanmigueli	Sp. nov	Valid	Thuy et al.	Early Cretaceous (Aptian)	Caranceja Formation	Spain	An ophioleucine ophiurid brittle star, a species of Ophioleuce.	
Ophiozonella eloy	Sp. nov	Valid	Thuy et al.	Early Cretaceous (Aptian)	Caranceja Formation	Spain	An ophiolepidid brittle star, a species of Ophiozonella.	
Ophiozonella thomasi	Sp. nov	Valid	Thuy et al.	Early Cretaceous (late Aptian)	Glen Rose Formation	United States	An ophiolepidid brittle star, a species of Ophiozonella.	
Palaeocomaster benthuyi	Sp. nov	Valid	Hess	Early Jurassic (Pliensbachian)		France	A comatulid crinoid, a species of Palaeocomaster.	
Palaeocomaster musculosus	Sp. nov	Valid	Hess	Late Jurassic (Oxfordian)		France	A comatulid crinoid, a species of Palaeocomaster.	
Palaeocomaster paucicirrus	Sp. nov	Valid	Hess	Early or Middle Jurassic (Toarcian or Aalenian)		Germany	A comatulid crinoid, a species of Palaeocomaster.	
Paracomatula morator	Sp. nov	Valid	Hess	Late Jurassic (Oxfordian)		France	A paracomatulid crinoid, a species of Paracomatula.	
Paragonaster(?) haldixoni	Sp. nov	Valid	Jagt et al.	Middle Miocene	Grand Bay Formation	Grenada (Carriacou Island)	A starfish, possibly a species of Paragonaster.	
Pedinopsis hemisphaerica	Sp. nov	Valid	Abdelhamid	Late Cretaceous (Cenomanian)	Galala Formation	Algeria; Egypt	A sea urchin.	
Persiadiskos	Gen. et sp. nov	Valid	Guensburg & Rozhnov	Cambrian	Mila Formation	Iran	An agelacrinitid isorophid edrioasteroid. The type species is Persiadiskos zhuravlevi.	
Phymosoma elqotti	Sp. nov	Valid	Abdelhamid	Late Cretaceous (Cenomanian)	Galala Formation	Egypt	A sea urchin.	
Reciprocodiscus	Gen. et sp. nov	Valid	Jell	Silurian (Llandovery)	Springfield Formation	Australia	An isorophid edrioasteroid. The type species is R. transambus.	
Rhabdobrissus tarnopolensis	Sp. nov	Valid	Radwański, Górka & Wysocka	Miocene (late Badenian)	Ternopil Beds	Ukraine	A brissid spatangoid, a species of Rhabdobrissus.	
Sierradiadema	Gen. et sp. nov	Valid	Mooi & Hilton	Middle Jurassic (Callovian)	Mariposa Formation	United States	A diadematacean sea urchin. The type species is Sierradiadema kristini.	
Stipecrinus	Gen. et sp. nov	Valid	Villanueva-Olea & Sour-Tovar	Carboniferous (Mississippian)	Ixtaltepec Formation	Mexico	A poteriocrinidan cladid crinoid. The type species is Stipecrinus splendidus.	
Storthingocrinus coronatus	Sp. nov	Valid	Bohatý, Hein & Webster	Devonian (middle Eifelian to early Givetian)	Junkerberg Formation; Loogh Formation	Germany	A disparid crinoid, a species of Storthingocrinus.	
Storthingocrinus ebbighauseni	Sp. nov	Valid	Bohatý, Hein & Webster	Devonian (Eifelian)	Ahrdorf Formation; Junkerberg Formation	Germany	A disparid crinoid, a species of Storthingocrinus.	
Storthingocrinus lobatus	Sp. nov	Valid	Bohatý, Hein & Webster	Devonian (earliest Givetian)	Ahbach Formation	Germany	A disparid crinoid, a species of Storthingocrinus.	
Tethyaster antares	Sp. nov	Valid	Fernández et al.	Early Cretaceous (early Valanginian)	Mulichinco Formation	Argentina	An astropectinid, a species of Tethyaster.	
Tetracrinus galei	Sp. nov	Valid	Hess	Late Jurassic (Oxfordian)		France	A cyrtocrinid crinoid, a species of Tetracrinus.	
Tiaracrinus jeanlemenni	Sp. nov	Valid	Klug et al.	Devonian (late Emsian)		Morocco	A zophocrinid disparid crinoid, a species of Tiaracrinus.	
