= List of edrioasteroid genera =

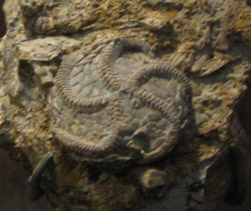
An edrioasteroid (Foerstediscus splendens).

This list of edrioasteroids is an attempt to create a comprehensive listing of all genera from the fossil record that have ever been considered to be edrioasteroids, excluding purely vernacular terms. The list includes all commonly accepted genera, but also genera that are now considered invalid, doubtful (nomina dubia), or were not formally published (nomina nuda), as well as junior synonyms of more established names, and genera that are no longer considered edrioasteroids.

== Naming conventions and terminology ==
Naming conventions and terminology follow the International Code of Zoological Nomenclature. Technical terms used include:

- Junior synonym: A name which describes the same taxon as a previously published name. If two or more genera are formally designated and the type specimens are later assigned to the same genus, the first to be published (in chronological order) is the senior synonym, and all other instances are junior synonyms. Senior synonyms are generally used, except by special decision of the ICZN, but junior synonyms cannot be used again, even if deprecated. Junior synonymy is often subjective, unless the genera described were both based on the same type specimen.
- Nomen nudum (Latin for "naked name"): A name that has appeared in print but has not yet been formally published by the standards of the ICZN. Nomina nuda (the plural form) are invalid, and are therefore not italicized as a proper generic name would be. If the name is later formally published, that name is no longer a nomen nudum and will be italicized on this list. Often, the formally published name will differ from any nomina nuda that describe the same specimen.
- Nomen oblitum (Latin for "forgotten name"): A name that has not been used in the scientific community for more than fifty years after its original proposal.
- Preoccupied name: A name that is formally published, but which has already been used for another taxon. This second use is invalid (as are all subsequent uses) and the name must be replaced. As preoccupied names are not valid generic names, they will also go unitalicized on this list.
- Nomen dubium (Latin for "dubious name"): A name describing a fossil with no unique diagnostic features. As this can be an extremely subjective and controversial designation, this term is not used on this list.

== The list ==
Genus	Authors	Year	Status	Age	Location	Notes
Aepyaster			nomen nudum			
Agelacrinites	Vanuxem	1842				First edrioasteroid formally described
Anglidiscus						
Apycnodiscus						
Archaepyrgus						
Astrocystites	Whiteaves	1897		Late Ordovician		First edrioblastoid described
Bassleridiscus						
Belochthus						
Bostryclavus						
Cambraster	Jaekel	1923		Miaolingian		
Cambroblastus	Smith and Jell	1990		Furongian		
Camptostroma	Ruedemann	1933		Cambrian Stage 4		Not always considered an edrioasteriod
Carneyella						
Chatsworthia						
Cincinnatidiscus						
Clavidiscus						
Cooperidiscus						
Cryptogoleus						
Curvitriordo						
Cyathocystis	Schmidt	1879				
Cyathotheca	Jaekel	1927				
Cyclaster	Billings	1857	Preoccupied name	Middle Ordovician		Junior homonym of Cyclaster Cotteau 1856; name replaced by Edrioaster Billings 1858
Cystaster						
Deltadiscus						
Dinocystis						
Discocystis						
Edrioaster	Billings	1858		Middle Ordovician		Replacementname for preoccupied Cyclaster Billings 1857
Edriodiscus	Jell, Burrett, and Banks	1985				
Edriophus	Bell	1976				
Epipaston						
Euhydrodiskos						
Fanulodiscus						
Foerstediscus						
Giganticlavus						
Hadrochthus						
Hemicystites						
Hypsiclavus						
Hystrichopsydrax						
Ikerus	Jell and Sprinkle	2021		Wuliuan		
Isorophus						
Isorophusella						
Kailidiscus	Zhao et al.	2010	Preoccupied name	Miaolingian		Junior homonym of ichnofossil Kailidiscus Wang 2006; name replaced by Parsleya Deshmukh 2022
Krama						
Lampteroblastus	Guesnburg and Sprinkle	1994		Floian		
Lebetodiscus						
Lepidoconia						
Lepidodiscus	Meek and Worthen	1868				
Lispidecodus						
Neoisorophusella						
Paredriophus						
Parsleya	Deshmukh	2022		Miaolingian		Replacement name for preoccupied Kailidiscus
Persiadiskos	Guensburg and Rozhnov	2014				
Porosublastus	Sprinkle and Sumrall	2015		Floian		
Postibulla						
Pyrgocystis						
Rectitriordo						
Rhenopyrgus	Dehm	1961		Ordovician–Middle Devonian		
Savagella						
Spiraclavus						
Sprinkleoglobus	Zhao et al.	2022		Cambrian Stage 3–Drumian		Includes "Totiglobus" lloydi
Streptaster						Among the earliest known edrioasteriods
Stromatocystites	Pompeckj	1896		Cambrian Stage 4–Drumian		
Thresherodiscus						
Timeischytes						
Totiglobus						
Ulrichidiscus						
Walcottidiscus	Bassler	1935		Burgess Shale		
Xenocystites						

== See also ==
- List of prehistoric brittle stars
- List of prehistoric sea cucumbers
- List of crinoid genera
