= Davidi =

Davidi may refer to:

== People ==
- Aharon Davidi (1927–2012), Israeli general
- Alon Davidi (born 1973), Israeli politician
- Efraim Davidi (born 1959), Israeli former professional footballer
- Guy Davidi (born 1978), Israeli documentary and filmmaker
- Udi Davidi (born 1975), Israeli singer, musician, lyricist and composer
- Uriel Davidi (1922–2006), Jewish religious leader and theologian
- Davidi Kitai (born 1979), Belgian professional poker player

== Animals ==
- Neocaridina davidi, freshwater shrimp originating from eastern China
- Parabraxas davidi, Chinese moth
- Elaphe davidi, Asian snake
- Forficula davidi, earwig
- Xenocypris davidi, Chinese fish
- Amphipneustes davidi, sea urchin
- Catocala davidi, moth
- Ichthyophis davidi, caecilian
- Ciuciulea davidi, whale
- Tarachodes davidi, praying mantis
- Harpalus davidi, beetle
- Scythris davidi, moth
- Alcippe davidi, bird
- Arborophila davidi, partridge

== See also ==
- David (name)
