= Lepidodiscus =

Lepidodiscus may refer to:

- Lepidodiscus (diatom), an extinct genus of prehistoric diatoms
- Lepidodiscus (echinoderm), an extinct genus of prehistoric echinoderms
