= Yorkicystis =

Yorkicystis Temporal range: Cambrian, 510 Ma

Scientific classification
- Kingdom: Animalia
- Phylum: Echinodermata
- Class: †Edrioasteroidea
- Genus: †Yorkicystis; Zamora et al., 2022

Type species
- †Yorkicystis haefneri Zamora et al., 2022

Extinct genus of marine invertebrates

Yorkicystis is a genus of edrioasteroid echinoderm that lived 510 million years ago in the Cambrian-aged Kinzers Formation in what is now Pennsylvania. This genus is important as it provides some of the oldest evidence of echinoderms losing their hard mineralized outer skeletons. Yorkicystis also shows that some echinoderms lost their skeletons during the Cambrian, which is a greatly different time as to when most other species lost theirs.

== Discovery ==
Fossils of this genus were first discovered in May 2017 by Christopher Haefner in a churchyard in York, Pennsylvania in shale deposits in the Emigsville Member of the Kinzers Formation. Two specimens were found, and numbered NHMUK EE 1659–1660. Aside from Yorkicystis other echinoderms like Lepidocystis and Camptostroma have been found in the formation. The species name is in honor of Haefner, who discovered the fossils, and the genus name is derived from the town of York.

== Description ==
Yorkicystis is unique because it has a non-mineralized skeleton. Most echinoderm groups around today like starfish and sea urchins have a mineralized skeleton, and others like derived crinoids and holothurians (sea cucumbers) have one, but it is greatly reduced.

== Classification ==
Placement of Yorkicystis

- Echinodermata
  - Helicoplacus
  - - Helicocystis
    - - - Stromatocystites
        - - - Titanocrinus
            - Apektocrinus
          - - Lepidocystis
            - Vyscystis
            - Ridersia
            - Gogia
      - - - Argodiscus
          - Isorophus
        - - Kailidiscus
          - Yorkicystis

Placement of Yorkicystis in Echinodermata found by Zamora et al., 2022 Not all of the echinoderms are edrioasteroids with some being Edrioasteroids, Blastozoa, Crinoids, Helicocystoid and Helicoplacoid).

Yorkicystis is a member of the edrioasteroidea, a class of echinoderms that lived by cementing themselves to hard surfaces like hardgrounds, and sometimes to living creatures like brachiopods. These are some of the oldest echinoderms in the fossil record with some species having been found in Cambrian-aged sediments, and possibly Ediacaran sediments in the form of Arkarua (but the taxonomy of those specimens has been quite controversial). In the 2022 paper, researchers found Yorkicystis to form a larger clade with edrioasteroids Isorophus, Argodiscus, and Kailidiscus. Due to its unique appearance and age, Yorkicystis was placed in the new family Yorkicystitidae.

== Paleoecology ==
The Kinzers Formation dates from the middle Dyeran to the Delamaran stage of the middle Cambrian. The formation was identified by the presence of Wanneria walcottana and Olenellus roddyi found in the same deposits. High quality fossil specimens were obtained from the Noah Getz Quarry, one mile north of Rohrerstown, Pennsylvania, but the quarry location is overgrown and disturbed by development. The fossils are from the Emigsville Member and include the trilobites Olenellus thompson, Olenellus roddyi, and Wanneria walcottana. The radiodont Lenisicaris pennsylvanica, and the bivalved arthropod Tuzoia getzi. Also found is the bizarre frondose organism Margaretia dorus.
