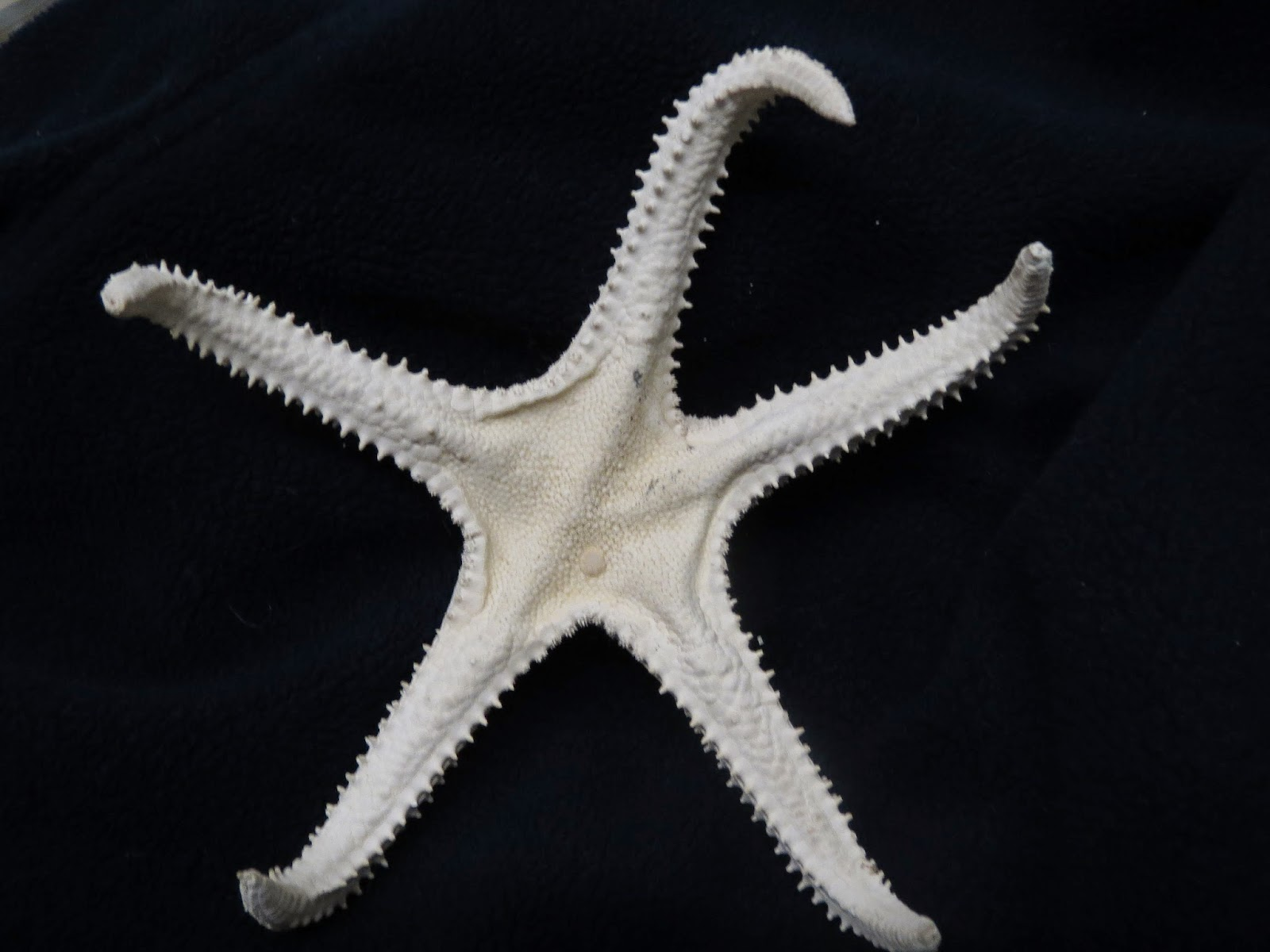
- Circeaster arandae

Scientific classification
- Kingdom: Animalia
- Phylum: Echinodermata
- Class: Asteroidea
- Order: Valvatida
- Family: Goniasteridae
- Genus: Circeaster; Koehler, 1909

= Circeaster =

Genus of starfishes

Circeaster is a genus of abyssal sea stars in the family Goniasteridae.

== Habitat and distribution ==
These sea stars have a flattened and broad pentagonal central disc, with 5 tapering arms. The marginal plates are thick and well delimited.

They live between 320 and 3000 meters deep, in the three main oceanic basins.

== Species list ==
According to World Register of Marine Species:

- Circeaster americanus (A.H. Clark, 1916)
- Circeaster arandae Mah, 2006
- Circeaster helenae Mah, 2006
- Circeaster kristinae Mah, 2006
- Circeaster loisetteae Mah, 2006
- Circeaster magdalenae Koehler, 1909
- Circeaster mandibulum Mah, 2026
- Circeaster marcelli Koehler, 1909
- Circeaster pullus Mah, 2006
- Circeaster sandrae Mah, 2006
