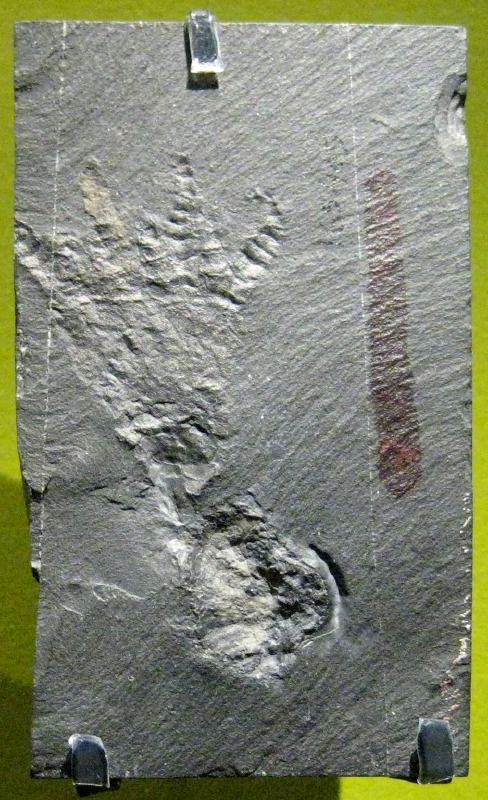
- Echmatocrinus brachiatus

Scientific classification
- Kingdom: Animalia
- Phylum: incertae sedis
- Genus: †Echmatocrinus
- Species: †E. brachiatus

Binomial name
- †Echmatocrinus brachiatus Sprinkle 1973

= Echmatocrinus =

Echmatocrinus Temporal range: Burgess shale

Extinct genus of marine invertebrates

Echmatocrinus brachiatus is an extinct species of Cambrian animal which resembles a crinoid or an octocoral. Its exact taxonomy is still a subject of debate. It is known only from the Burgess Shale. Around 20 specimens of Echmatocrinus are known; these comprise <0.02% of the community.

The creature resembled an inverted cone, with a crown of seven to ten tentacles. Each tentacle was covered with small extensions. The cone itself was covered with irregularly arranged mineralised plates, whose texture recalls that of the Burgess Shale echinoderm Walcottidiscus. The organisms lived a solitary lifestyle, although juveniles are sometimes attached to (or budding from) adults.
