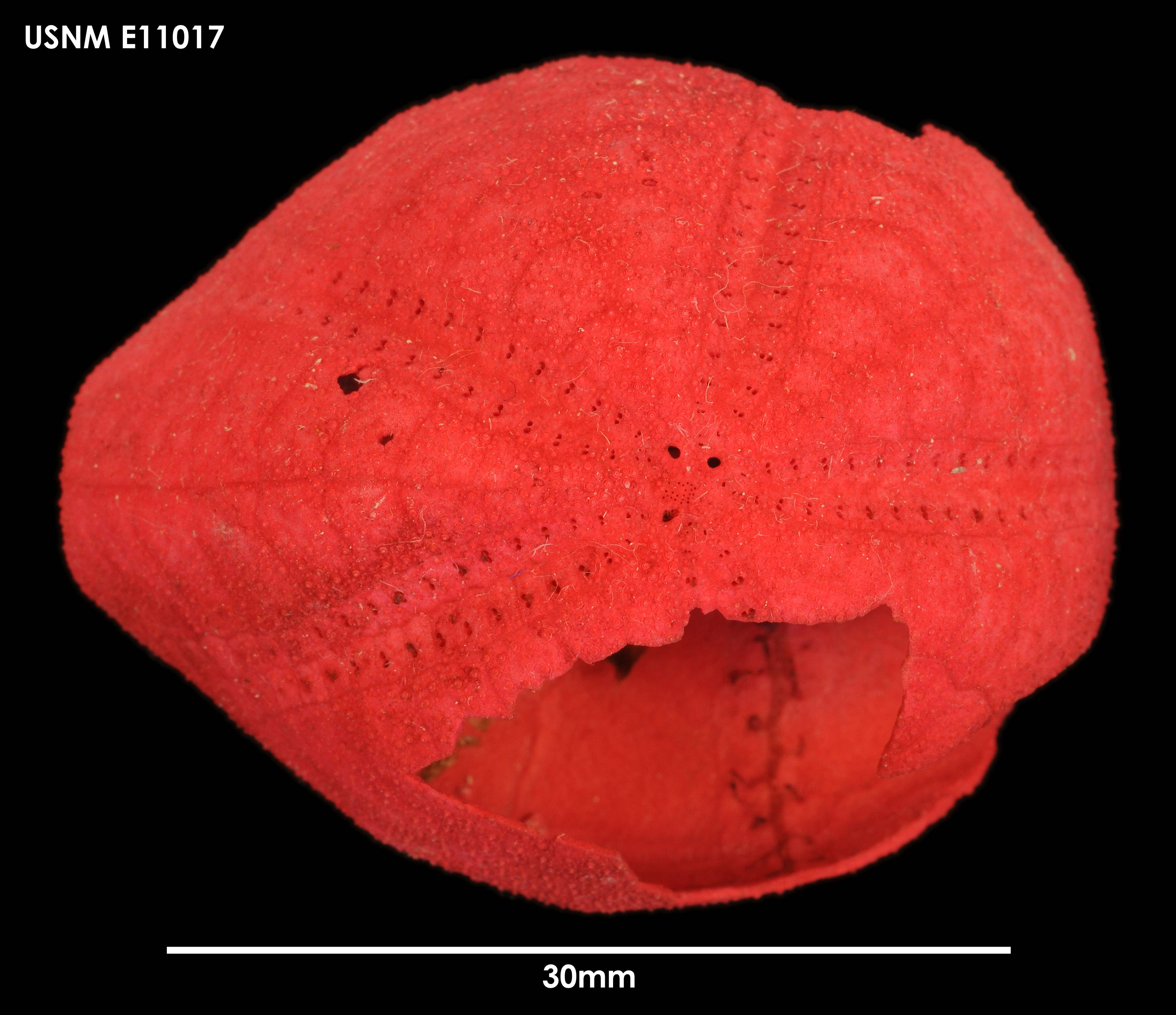

Scientific classification
- Kingdom: Animalia
- Phylum: Echinodermata
- Class: Echinoidea
- Order: Spatangoida
- Genus: Amphipneustes
- Species: A. marsupialis

Binomial name
- Amphipneustes marsupialis (Koehler, 1926)

= Amphipneustes marsupialis =

Species of sea urchin

Amphipneustes marsupialis is a species of sea urchin. Their armour is covered with spines. It is placed in the genus Amphipneustes and lives in the sea. Amphipneustes marsupialis was first scientifically described in 1926 by Koehler.
