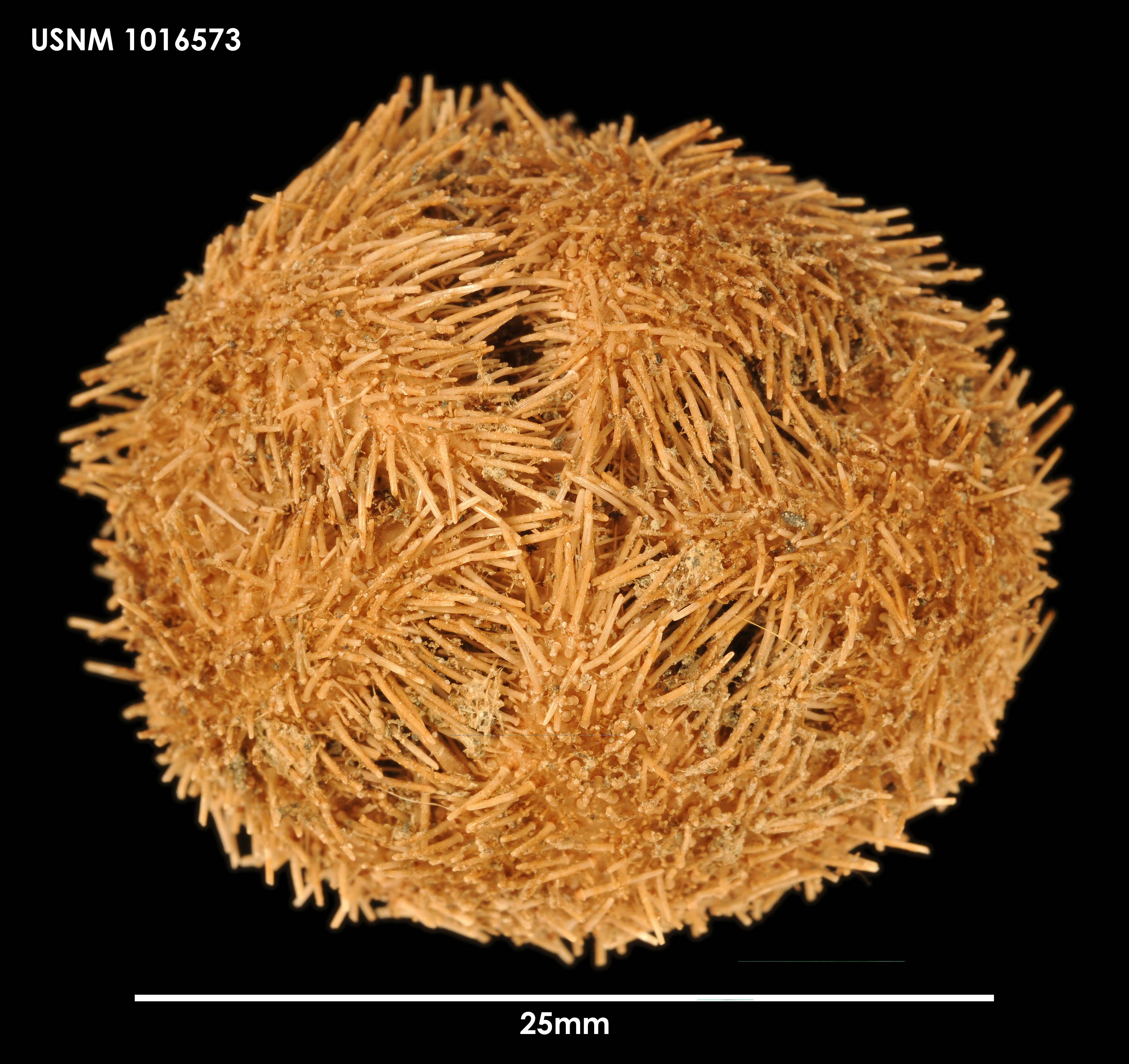
- PRESERVED SPECIMEN; Preparations: Dry; Amphipneustes koehleri Mortensen, 1905

Scientific classification
- Kingdom: Animalia
- Phylum: Echinodermata
- Class: Echinoidea
- Order: Spatangoida
- Suborder: Paleopneustina
- Genus: Amphipneustes; Koehler, 1900

= Amphipneustes =

Genus of sea urchins

Amphipneustes is a genus of echinoderms belonging to the order Spatangoida.

The species of this genus are found at the coasts of Antarctica.

Species:

- Amphipneustes bifidus Mortensen, 1950
- Amphipneustes brevisternalis (Koehler, 1926)
- Amphipneustes davidi Madon-Senez, 2002
- Amphipneustes koehleri Mortensen, 1905
- Amphipneustes lorioli Koehler, 1901
- Amphipneustes marsupialis (Koehler, 1926)
- Amphipneustes mironovi Markov, 1991
- Amphipneustes rostratus (Koehler, 1926)
- Amphipneustes similis Mortensen, 1936
- Amphipneustes tumescens (Koehler, 1926)
