= A. tumescens =

A. tumescens may refer to:

- Acanthocephalus tumescens, a species of parasitic worm.
- Amphipneustes tumescens, a species of sea urchin.
- Terrabacter tumescens (formerly Arthrobacter tumescens), a Gram-positive bacterium.
