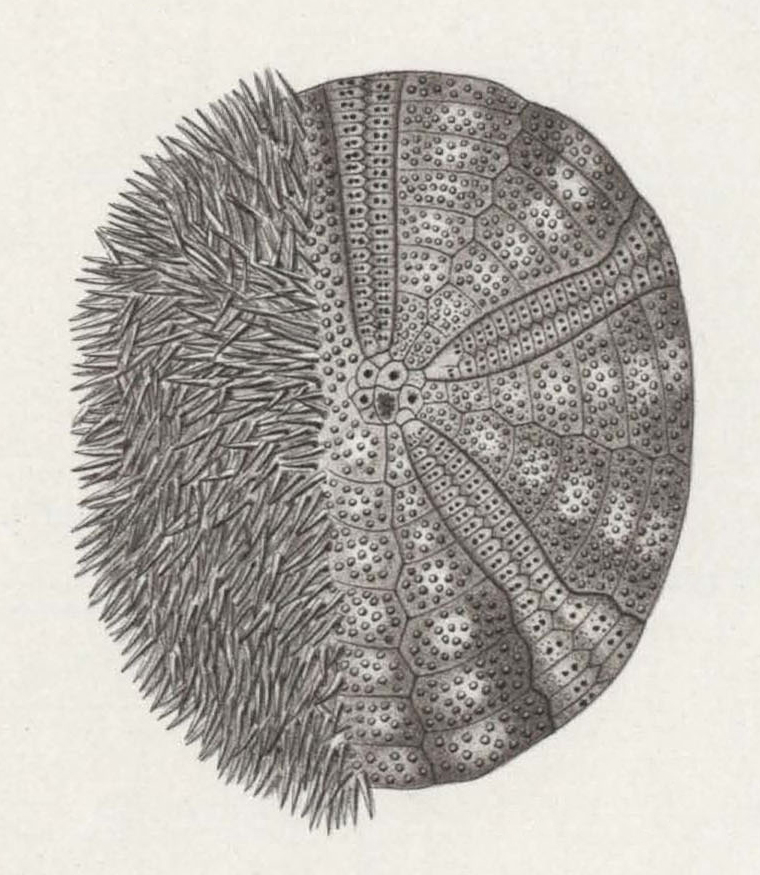

Scientific classification
- Kingdom: Animalia
- Phylum: Echinodermata
- Class: Echinoidea
- Order: Spatangoida
- Genus: Amphipneustes
- Species: A. lorioli

Binomial name
- Amphipneustes lorioli Koehler, 1901

= Amphipneustes lorioli =

Species of sea urchin

Amphipneustes lorioli is a species of sea urchin. Their armour is covered with spines. It is placed in the genus Amphipneustes and lives in the sea. Amphipneustes lorioli was first scientifically described in 1901 by Koehler.
