= K. chinensis =

K. chinensis may refer to:

- Kailidiscus chinensis, an extinct species of echinoderm which existed in what is now China during the Middle Cambrian period
- Kerria chinensis, a scale insect species in the genus Kerria

== See also ==
- Chinensis (disambiguation)
