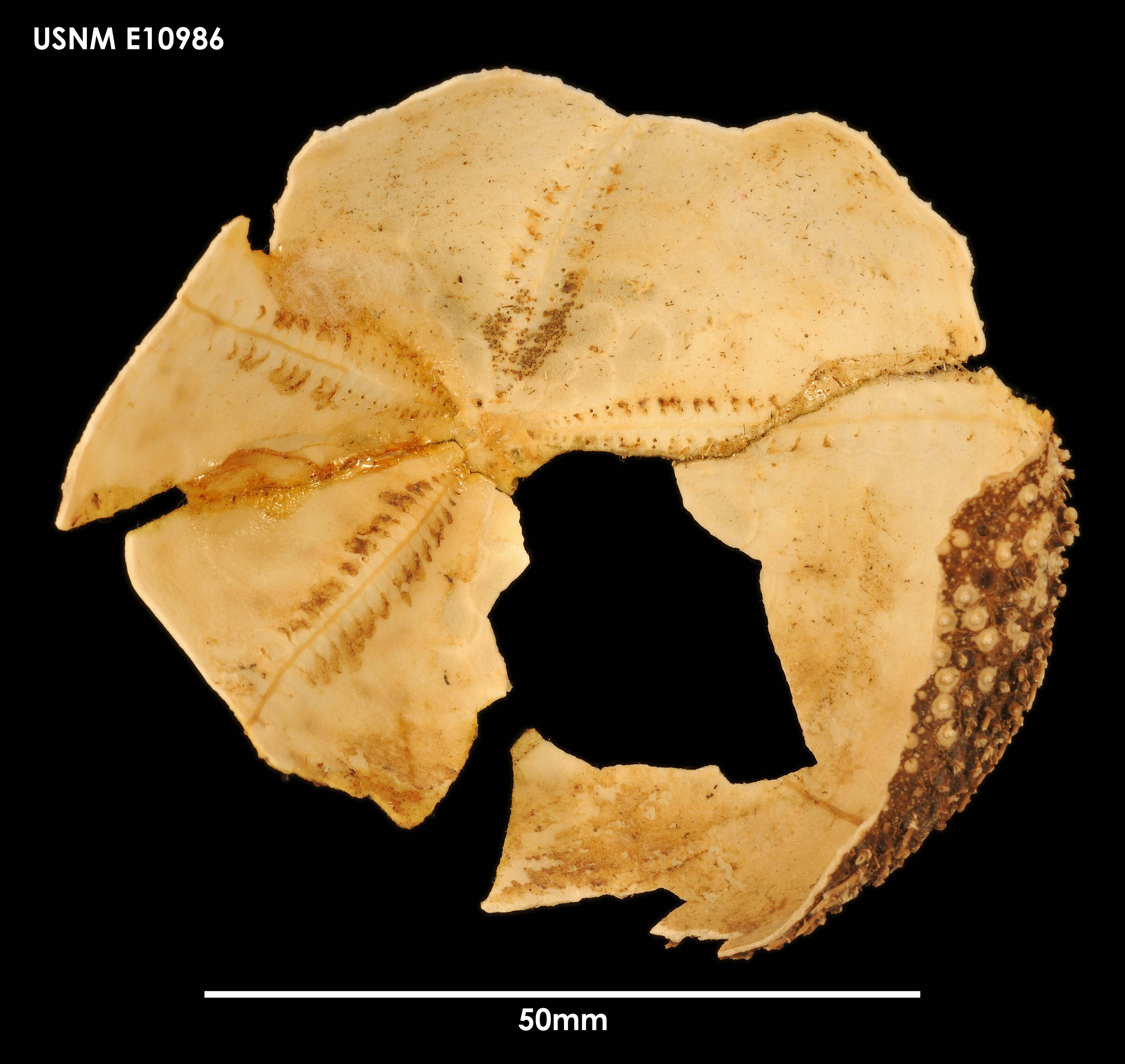

Scientific classification
- Kingdom: Animalia
- Phylum: Echinodermata
- Class: Echinoidea
- Order: Spatangoida
- Genus: Amphipneustes
- Species: A. brevisternalis

Binomial name
- Amphipneustes brevisternalis (Koehler, 1926)

= Amphipneustes brevisternalis =

Species of sea urchin

Amphipneustes brevisternalis is a species of sea urchin. Their armour is covered with spines. It is placed in the genus Amphipneustes and lives in the sea. Amphipneustes brevisternalis was first scientifically described in 1926 by Koehler.
