= Amphipneustes rostratus =

Scientific classification
- Kingdom: Animalia
- Phylum: Echinodermata
- Class: Echinoidea
- Order: Spatangoida
- Genus: Amphipneustes
- Species: A. rostratus

Binomial name
- Amphipneustes rostratus (Koehler, 1926)

Species of sea urchin

Amphipneustes rostratus is a species of sea urchin. Their armour is covered with spines. It is placed in the genus Amphipneustes and lives in the sea. Amphipneustes rostratus was first scientifically described in 1926 by Koehler.
