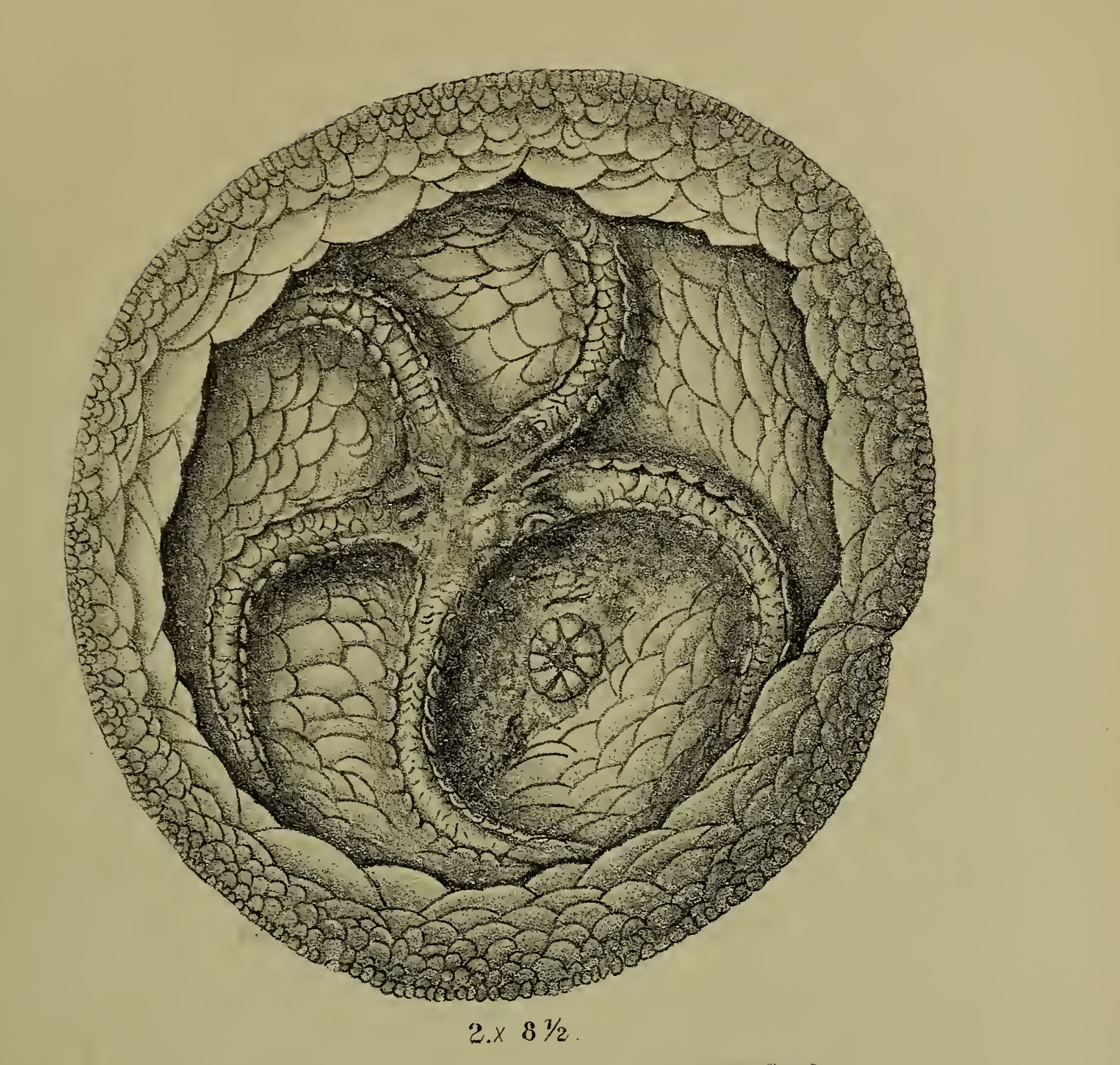

Scientific classification
- Kingdom: Animalia
- Phylum: Echinodermata
- Class: †Edrioasteroidea
- Order: †Isorophida
- Family: †Agelacrinitidae
- Genus: †Lepidodiscus; Meek and Worthen, 1868

Species
- †Lepidodiscus lebouri

= Lepidodiscus (echinoderm) =

Extinct genus of marine invertebrates

Lepidodiscus is an extinct genus of prehistoric echinoderms in the class Edrioasteroidea.
