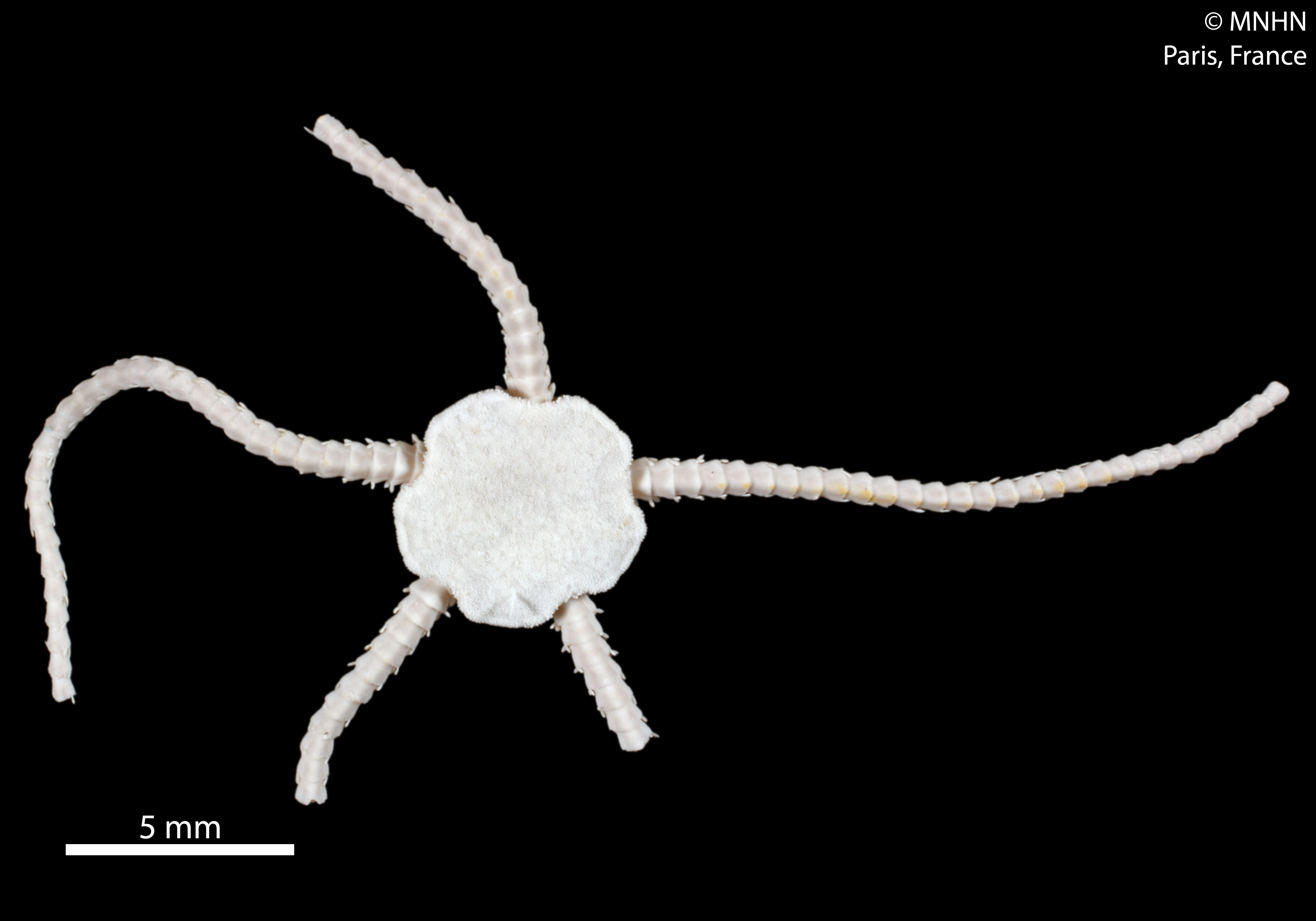
- Dried preserved specimen of Ophioleuce seminudum

Scientific classification
- Kingdom: Animalia
- Phylum: Echinodermata
- Class: Ophiuroidea
- Order: Ophioleucida
- Family: Ophioleucidae; Matsumoto, 1915

Type genus
- Ophioleuce Koehler, 1904

Genera
- 7, see text

Synonyms
- Ophioleucinae Matsumoto, 1915

= Ophioleucidae =

Ophioleucidae Temporal range: 114–0 Ma Early Cretaceous to Present

Subfamily of brittle stars

Ophioleucidae is a family of brittle stars belonging to the order Ophioleucida. Fossils from this family have been found dating to the Late Aptian in the Early Cretaceous.

== Taxonomy ==
There are seven genera in the family.

- Eirenura† Thuy, 2011
- Ophioleuce Koehler, 1904
- Ophiopallas Koehler, 1904
- Ophiopinna† Hess, 1960
- Ophiopyren Lyman, 1878
- Ophiostriatus Madsen, 1983
- Sinosura† Hess, 1964
