= Cambraster =

Cambraster Temporal range: 513.0–501.0 Ma

Scientific classification
- Kingdom: Animalia
- Phylum: Echinodermata
- Class: †Edrioasteroidea
- Order: †Stromatocystitida
- Family: †Stromatocystitidae
- Genus: †Cambraster; Jaekel 1923

Type species
- Trochocystites cannati Miquel 1894

Species
- †Cambraster cannati (Miquel 1894); †Cambraster elegans Termier & Termier 1979; †Cambraster tastudorum Jell, Burrett & Banks 1985; †Cambraster cf. tastudorum

Extinct genus of marine invertebrates

Cambraster is an extinct genus of edrioasteroids with species that existed during the Cambrian.

== See also ==
- List of prehistoric echinoderm genera
- List of edrioasteroids
