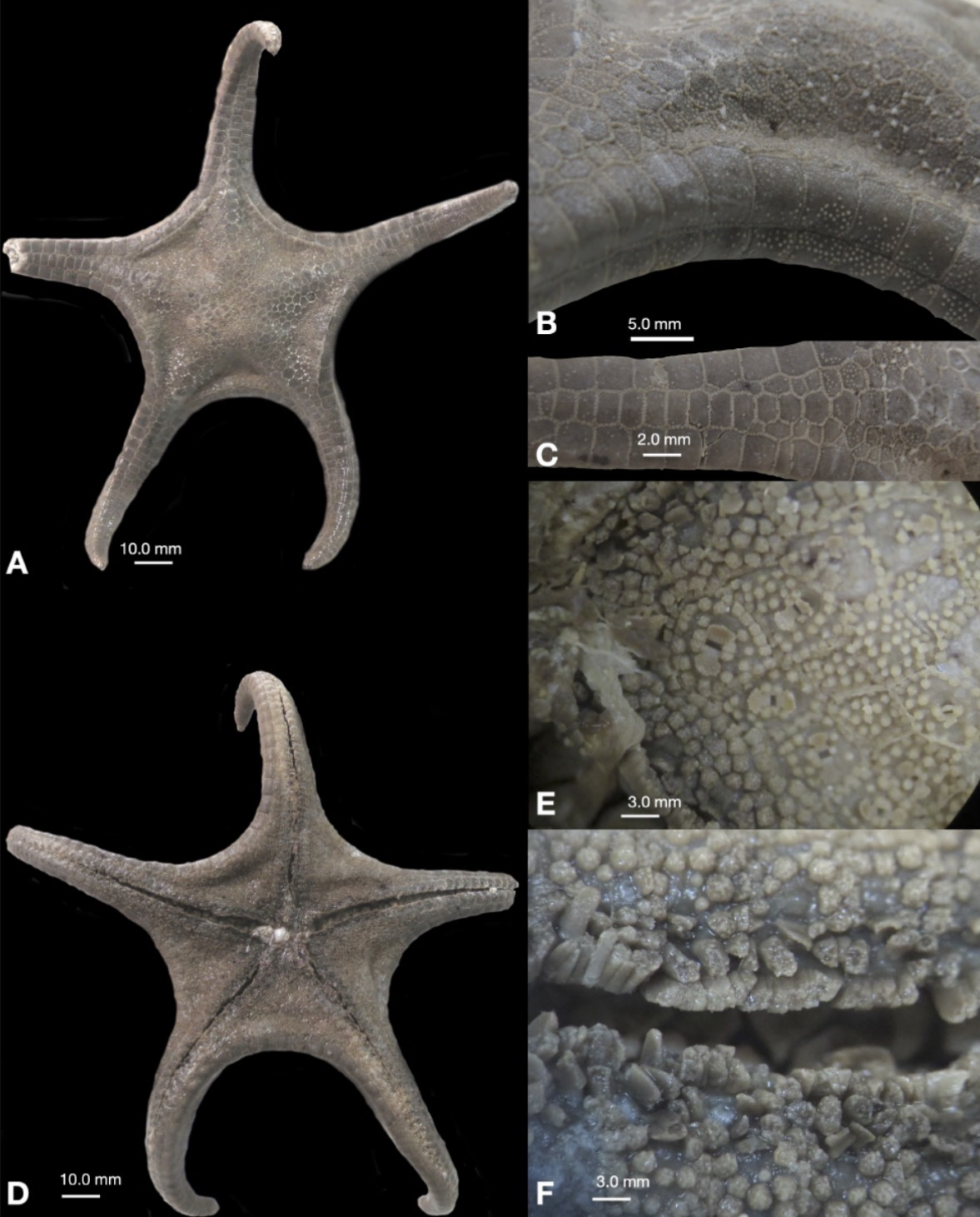

Scientific classification
- Kingdom: Animalia
- Phylum: Echinodermata
- Class: Asteroidea
- Order: Valvatida
- Family: Goniasteridae
- Genus: Circeaster
- Species: C. mandibulum

Binomial name
- Circeaster mandibulum Mah, 2026

= Circeaster mandibulum =

Species of sea star

Circeaster mandibulum is a species of deep-sea sea star in the family Goniasteridae found in New Caledonia.

== Etymology ==
The species epithet mandibulum is Latin for "jaw", alluding to the pedicellariae present on the adambulacral plates.

== Taxonomy ==
it is distinguished from Circeaster loisetteae by having 8 to 15 flattened, blade-like furrow spines in a palmate arrangement (versus 7 to 8 spines that are quadrate in cross-section in C. loisetteae) and by having abutted superomarginal plates only at the distalmost tip of the arm (versus abutted superomarginals beginning at the arm base adjacent to the disk in C. loisetteae).

It is distinguished from Circeaster pullus, which possesses bivalve pedicellariae with nearly smooth valves and smooth, blunt furrow spines, whereas C. mandibulum lacks bivalve pedicellariae and has roughened, bristle-like furrow spine tips. It shows closer resemblance to Circeaster sandrae in lacking bivalve pedicellariae, but differs by having 8 to 15 triangular to quadrate furrow spines with roughened tips, compared to C. sandrae, which has 4 to 8 flattened, blunt, and smooth furrow spines.

== Description ==
The species has a stout, stellate body with an arm length to disk radius ratio of 2.8–3.3 and elongate, triangular arms with rounded tips. The abactinal plates are flat, mostly bare, and covered with 10–15 round granules widely distributed on each plate. Abactinal plates on the arms become gradually larger than those on the disk.

There are 36 to 38 superomarginal plates and 38 to 40 inferomarginal plates (at R=4.0 to 5.0). The superomarginals form a prominent border, comprising 13–17% of the disk radius, and are abutted over the midline for the 10–15 plates at the arm terminus. The surface of the marginal plates is mostly bare but covered with 20–30 coarse, round granules. Nearly every actinal intermediate plate bears a single, palm-like pedicellaria with wide valves that have 3 to 5 serrations each.

Furrow spines number 8–15, are flattened and blade-like, and are arranged in a straight to palmate pattern. Subambulacral spines are absent, but 1 or 2 palmate to clam-shaped pedicellariae are present per adambulacral plate.

== Distribution and habitat ==
This species is known from New Caledonia at depths of 320 to 470 meters.
