= Amphipneustes bifidus =

Scientific classification
- Domain: Eukaryota
- Kingdom: Animalia
- Phylum: Echinodermata
- Class: Echinoidea
- Order: Spatangoida
- Genus: Amphipneustes
- Species: A. bifidus

Binomial name
- Amphipneustes bifidus Mortensen, 1950

Species of sea urchin

Amphipneustes bifidus is a species of sea urchin. Their armor is covered with spines. It is placed in the genus Amphipneustes and lives in the sea. Amphipneustes bifidus was first scientifically described in 1950 by Ole Mortensen, a Danish scientist.
