= Ophioleuce =

Ophioleuce Temporal range: 114–0 Ma Early Cretaceous to Present
- Ophioleuce brevispinum

Scientific classification
- Kingdom: Animalia
- Phylum: Echinodermata
- Class: Ophiuroidea
- Order: Ophioleucida
- Family: Ophioleucidae
- Genus: Ophioleuce; Koehler, 1904

Type species
- Ophioleuce seminudum Koehler, 1904

Species
- 8, see text

Synonyms
- Ophiocirce Koehler, 1904; Ophiocircus

Genus of brittle stars

Ophioleuce is a genus of brittle stars in the family Ophioleucidae. Fossils from this genus have been found dating to the Early Cretaceous (Late Aptian).
