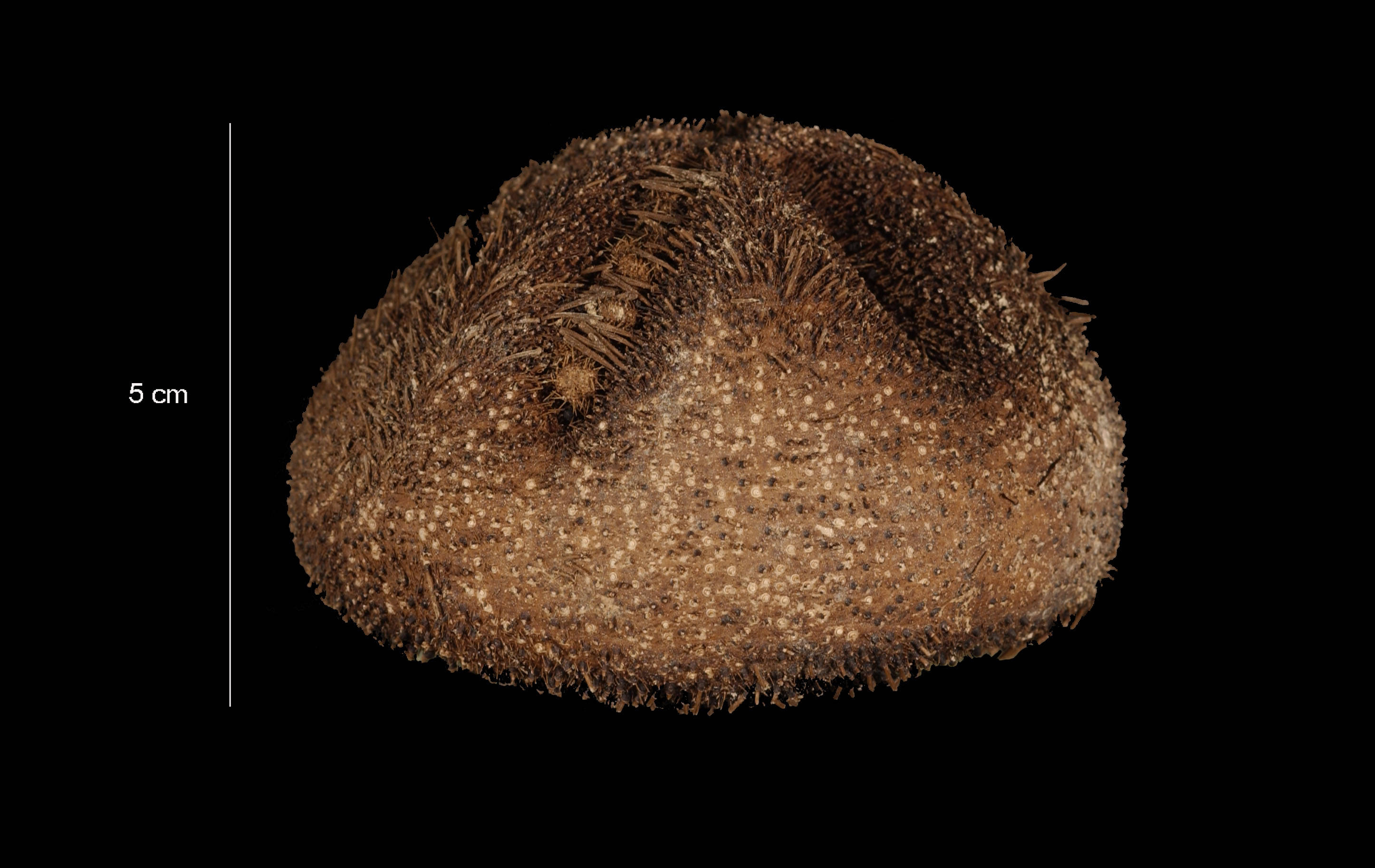

Scientific classification
- Domain: Eukaryota
- Kingdom: Animalia
- Phylum: Echinodermata
- Class: Echinoidea
- Order: Spatangoida
- Genus: Amphipneustes
- Species: A. similis

Binomial name
- Amphipneustes similis (Mortensen, 1936)

= Amphipneustes similis =

Species of sea urchin

Amphipneustes similis is a species of sea urchin. Their armour is covered with spines. It is placed in the genus Amphipneustes and lives in the sea. Amphipneustes similis was first scientifically described in 1936 by Ole Mortensen, Danish zoologist.
