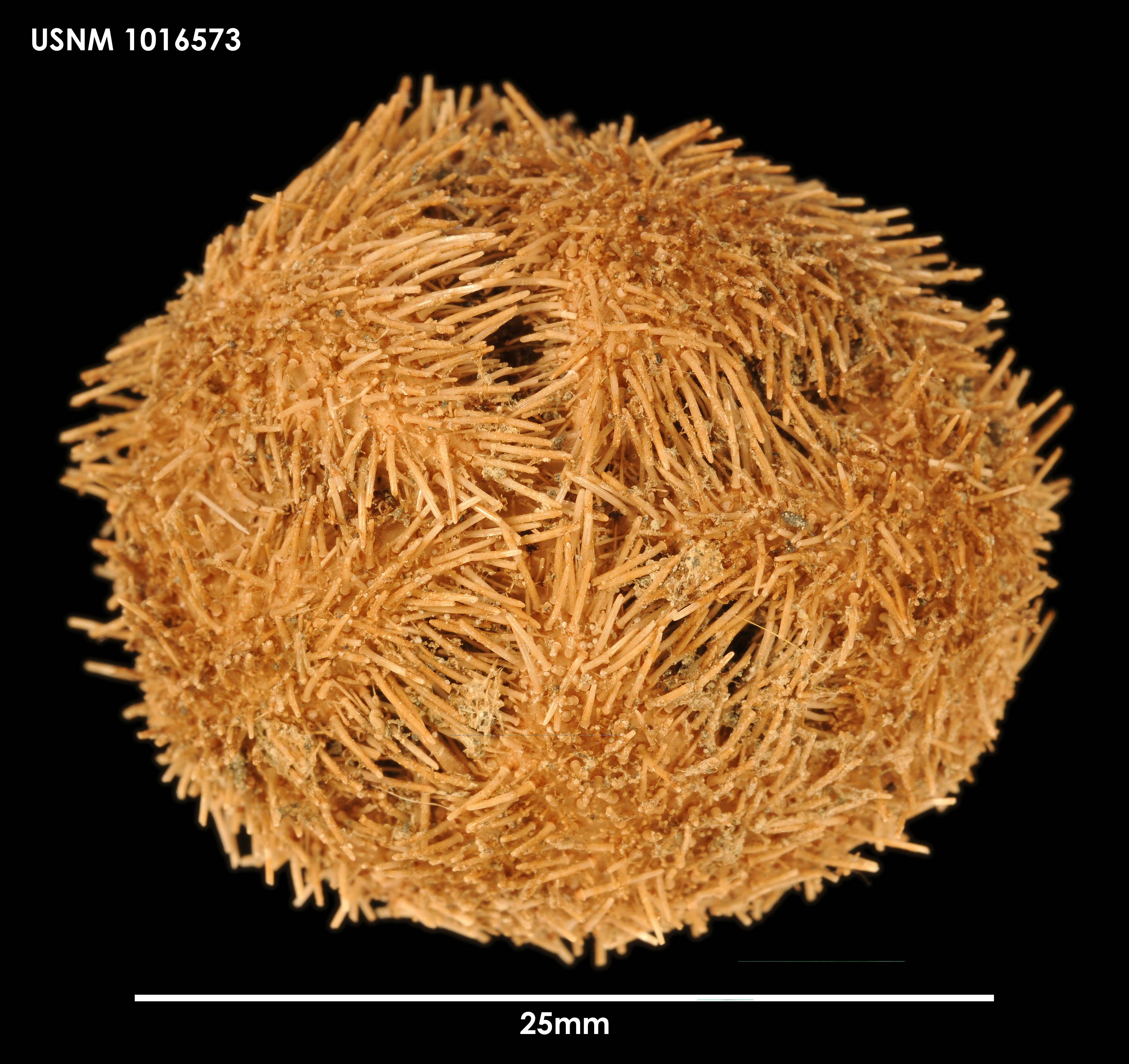

Scientific classification
- Kingdom: Animalia
- Phylum: Echinodermata
- Class: Echinoidea
- Order: Spatangoida
- Genus: Amphipneustes
- Species: A. koehleri

Binomial name
- Amphipneustes koehleri (Mortensen, 1905)

= Amphipneustes koehleri =

Species of sea urchin

== Family and Discovery ==
Amphipneustes koehleri is a species of sea urchin. Their armour is covered with spines. It is placed in the genus Amphipneustes and lives in the sea. Amphipneustes koehleri was first scientifically described in 1905 by Ole Mortensen. The direct parent species to the koehleri is the Amphipneustes Koehler. It is registered as a valid non-fossilized species that still is alive today by the World Register of Marine Species.

== Location ==
This species of sea urchin is typically found in the cold, deep waters of the Southern Ocean, specifically around the South Georgia Islands and in the Scotia Sea due to their tolerance for low temperatures. They are typically found at depths of approximately 74 to 160 meters, inhabiting benthic communities in the sub-Antarctic region.

== How It Feeds ==
This species of sea urchin is a benthic deposit feeder, relying on organic matter found within the sediment such as detrius and microorganisms. It feeds, unlike other sea urchins who have Aristotle's Lantern, likely using its specialized tube "feet".

== Little Research ==
Not much research has been conducted on this species of sea urchin, despite its discovery over 1.2 centuries ago. This is due to the location of this species, being within the antarctic region. Due to its depth, temperature, and need for expensive equipment, expeditions in the region are difficult and costly. Many funders and researchers of marine research focus on more abundant and common species, leaving small, hard to reach, and costly-to-research species with less knowledge about them.
