= Amphipneustes tumescens =

Scientific classification
- Kingdom: Animalia
- Phylum: Echinodermata
- Class: Echinoidea
- Order: Spatangoida
- Genus: Amphipneustes
- Species: A. tumescens

Binomial name
- Amphipneustes tumescens (Koehler, 1926)

Species of sea urchin

Amphipneustes tumescens is a species of sea urchin. Their armour is covered with spines. It is placed in the genus Amphipneustes and lives in the sea. Amphipneustes tumescens was first scientifically described in 1926 by Koehler.
