= Amphipneustes mironovi =

Scientific classification
- Domain: Eukaryota
- Kingdom: Animalia
- Phylum: Echinodermata
- Class: Echinoidea
- Order: Spatangoida
- Genus: Amphipneustes
- Species: A. mironovi

Binomial name
- Amphipneustes mironovi Markov, 1991

Species of sea urchin

Amphipneustes mironovi is a species of sea urchin. Their armour is covered with spines. It is placed in the genus Amphipneustes and lives in the sea. Amphipneustes mironovi was first scientifically described in 1991 by Markov.
