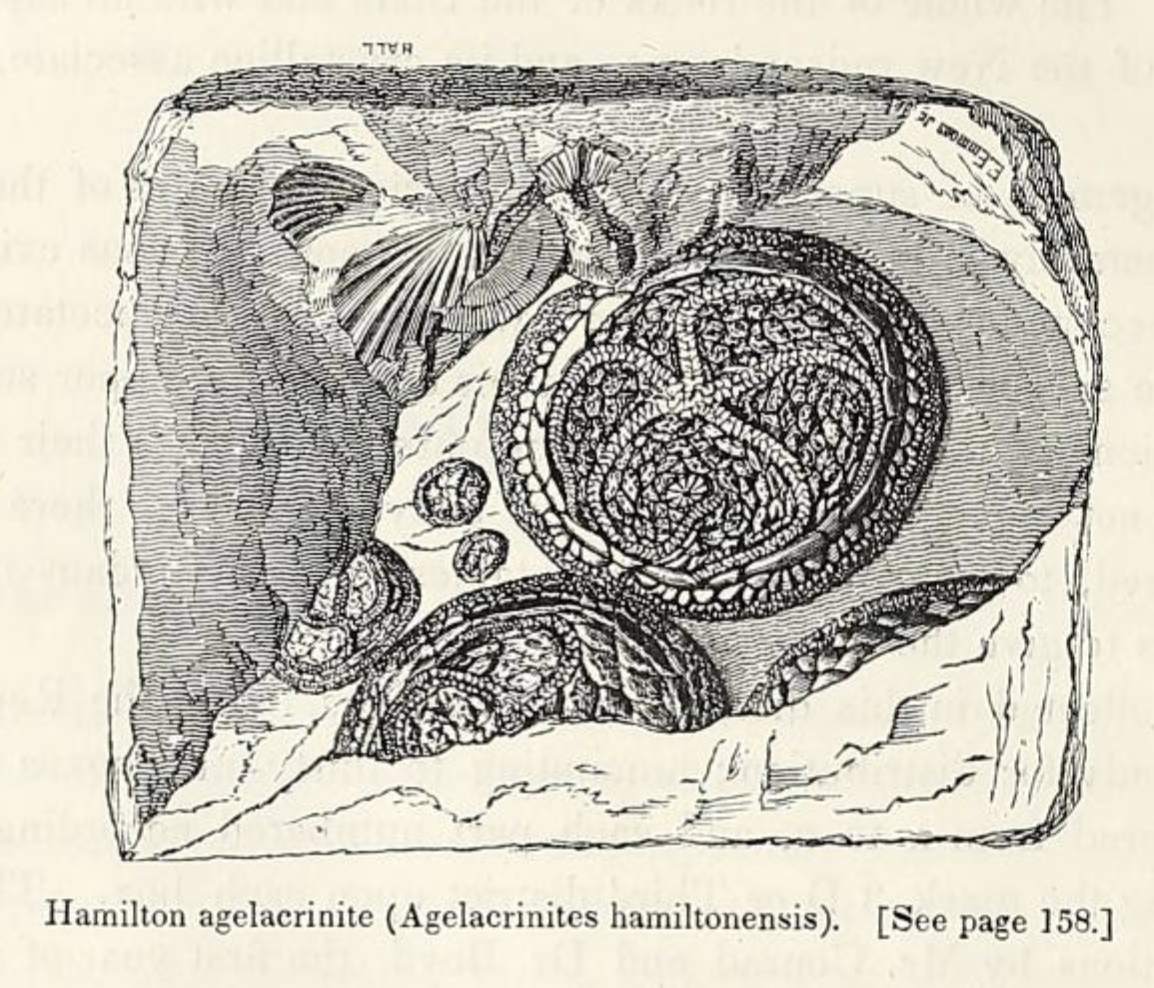

Scientific classification
- Kingdom: Animalia
- Phylum: Echinodermata
- Class: †Edrioasteroidea
- Order: †Isorophida
- Suborder: †Isorophina
- Family: †Agelacrinitidae; Chapman 1860

Subfamilies
- †Agelacrinitinae; †Postibullinae; †Discocystinae

= Agelacrinitidae =

Agelacrinitidae Temporal range: Silurian–Kungurian

Extinct family of marine invertebrates

Agelacrinitidae is an extinct family of prehistoric echinoderms in the class Edrioasteroidea.
