= Lepidodiscus (diatom) =

Scientific classification
- Domain: Eukaryota
- Clade: Sar
- Clade: Stramenopiles
- Division: Ochrophyta
- Clade: Bacillariophyta
- Class: Coscinodiscophyceae
- Order: Coscinodiscales
- Family: Hemidiscaceae
- Genus: †Lepidodiscus; Witt (1886)

Species
- †Lepidodiscus annamariae J.Witkowski & D.M.Harwood, 2010; †Lepidodiscus elegans (type)

Extinct genus of single-celled organisms

Lepidodiscus is an extinct genus of diatoms.
