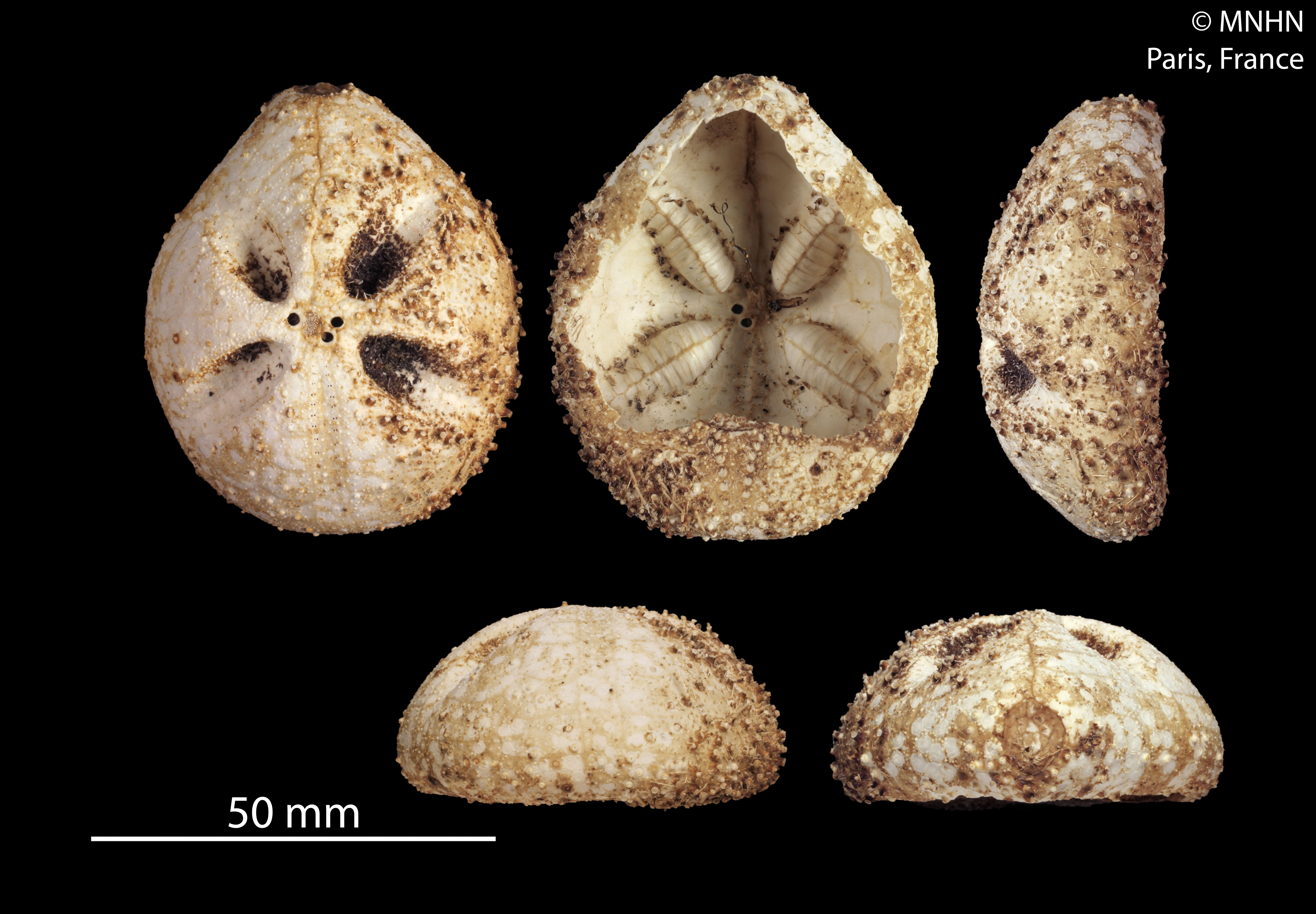

Scientific classification
- Domain: Eukaryota
- Kingdom: Animalia
- Phylum: Echinodermata
- Class: Echinoidea
- Order: Spatangoida
- Genus: Amphipneustes
- Species: A. davidi

Binomial name
- Amphipneustes davidi Madon-Senez, 2010

= Amphipneustes davidi =

Species of sea urchin

Amphipneustes davidi is a species of sea urchin. Their armour is covered with spines. It is placed in the genus Amphipneustes and lives in the sea. Amphipneustes davidi was first scientifically described in 2010 by Madon-Senez.
