= Harpalus davidi =

Scientific classification
- Kingdom: Animalia
- Phylum: Arthropoda
- Class: Insecta
- Order: Coleoptera
- Suborder: Adephaga
- Family: Carabidae
- Genus: Harpalus
- Species: H. davidi

Binomial name
- Harpalus davidi (Tschitscherine, 1897)

Species of beetle

Harpalus davidi is a species of ground beetle in the subfamily Harpalinae. It was described by Tschitscherine in 1897.
