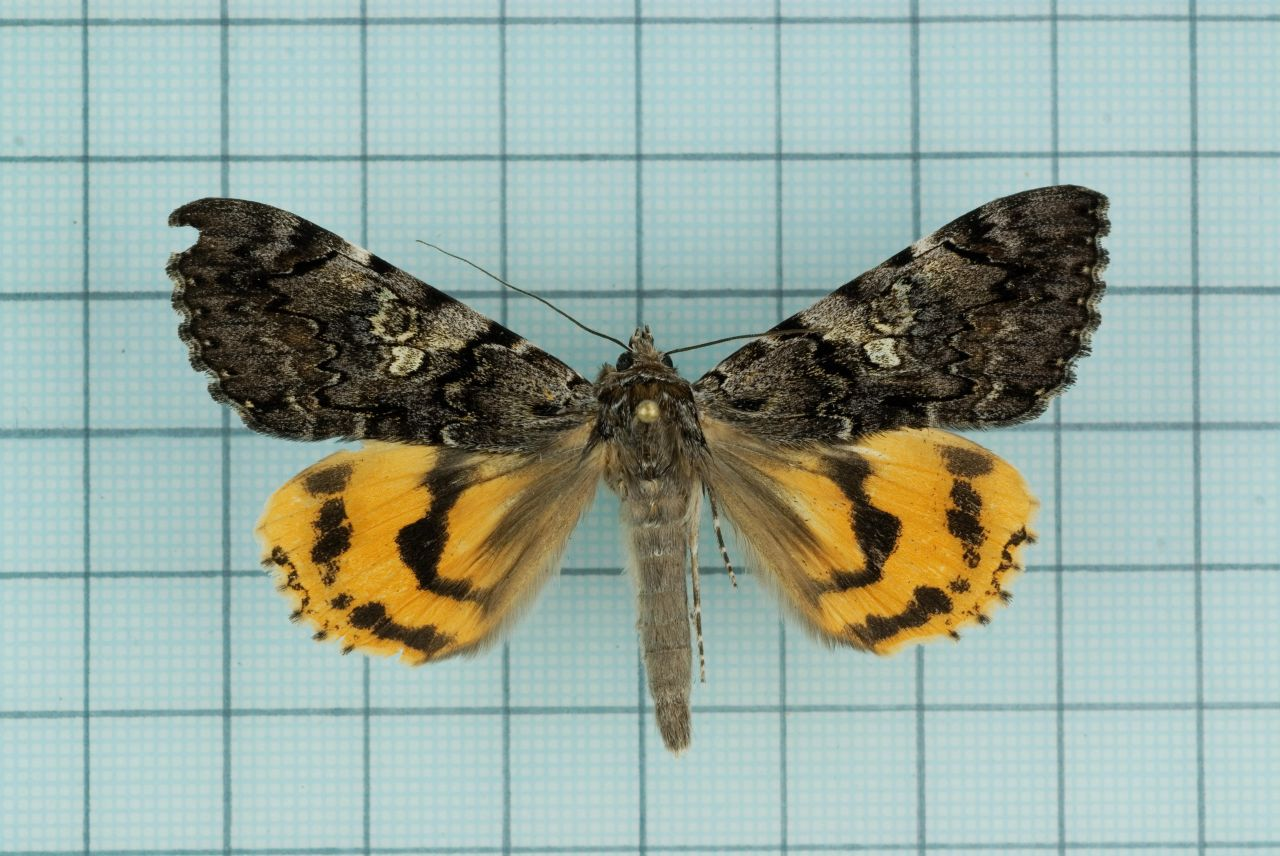
- Catocala armandi shirozui

Scientific classification
- Kingdom: Animalia
- Phylum: Arthropoda
- Class: Insecta
- Order: Lepidoptera
- Superfamily: Noctuoidea
- Family: Erebidae
- Genus: Catocala
- Species: C. davidi

Binomial name
- Catocala davidi Oberthür, 1881

= Catocala davidi =

Species of moth

Catocala davidi is a moth in the family Erebidae first described by Oberthür in 1881. It lives in northern China.
