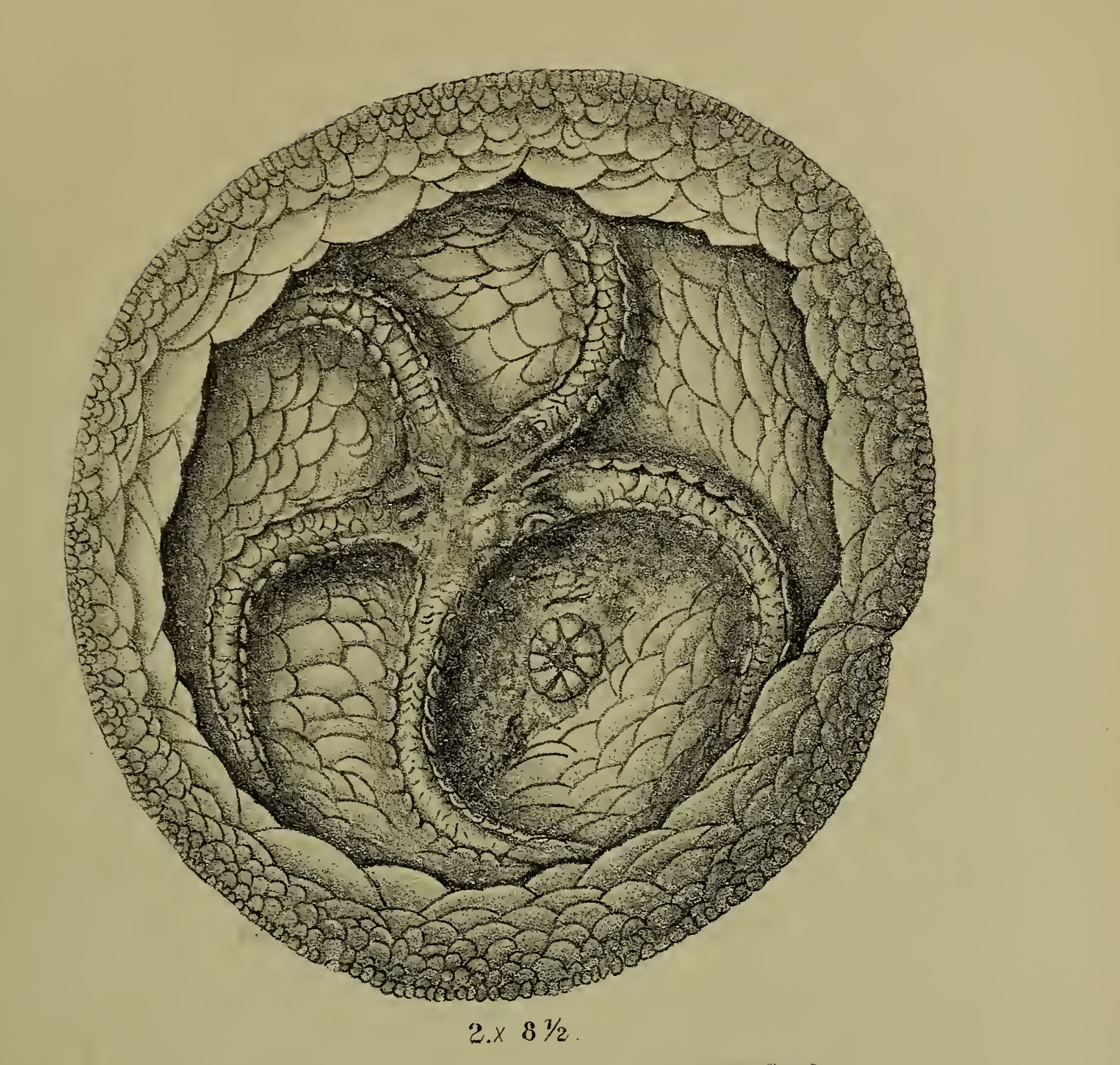
- Lepidodiscus, an agelacrinitid isorophid

Scientific classification
- Kingdom: Animalia
- Phylum: Echinodermata
- Class: †Edrioasteroidea
- Order: †Isorophida; Bell 1974

Suborders and Families
- †Isorophina; †Isorophidae; †Agelacrinitidae; †Lebetodiscina; †Lebetodiscidae; †Carneyellidae; incertae sedis; †Pyrgocystidae

= Isorophida =

Isorophida Temporal range: 488.3–272.5 Ma

Extinct order of marine invertebrates

Isorophida is an extinct order of prehistoric echinoderms in the class Edrioasteroidea. Isorophids are characterized by a disc-shaped, dome-shaped or club-shaped theca with ambulacra typically limited to the upward-facing oral surface which is bordered by an peripheral rim that flares outward parallel to the substrate. The aboral (substrate-facing) surface is unplated.

Isorophids are the most common order of edrioasteroids.
