= Isorophus =

- Carneyella faberi and Isorophus cincinnatiensis fossils

Scientific classification
- Kingdom: Animalia
- Phylum: Echinodermata
- Class: †Edrioasteroidea
- Genus: †Isorophus

Extinct genus of echinoderms

Isorophus is an extinct genus of Echinoderm belonging to the class Edrioasteroidea. It is commonly found in deposits dating to the Ordovician period. There are several species, with one (Isorophus cincinnatiensis) being the official fossil of the city of Cincinnati in the US state of Ohio.
