= Kailidiscus =

Kailidiscus Temporal range: Middle Cambrian

Scientific classification
- Kingdom: Animalia
- Phylum: Echinodermata
- Class: †Edrioasteroidea
- Family: †incertae sedis
- Genus: †Kailidiscus; Zhao et al., 2010
- Species: †K. chinensis

Binomial name
- †Kailidiscus chinensis Zhao et al., 2010

Extinct genus of marine invertebrates

Kailidiscus is an extinct genus of echinoderms which existed in what is now China during the Middle Cambrian period. It was named by Yuanlong Zhao, Colin D. Sumrall, Ronald L. Parsley and Jin Peng in 2010, and the type and only species is Kailidiscus chinensis. It bears close resemblance to the Burgess Shale fossil Walcottidiscus.
