= Walcottidiscus =

Walcottidiscus Temporal range: Burgess Shale

Scientific classification
- Domain: Eukaryota
- Kingdom: Animalia
- Phylum: Echinodermata
- Class: †Edrioasteroidea
- Genus: †Walcottidiscus; Bassler, 1935

Species
- W. magister; W. typicallis

Extinct genus of marine invertebrates

Walcottidiscus is a genus of pentagonally shaped echinoderms known from the Middle Cambrian Burgess Shale. 16 specimens of Walcottidiscus are known from the Greater Phyllopod bed, where they comprise < 0.1% of the community.

The genus is thought to be the earliest known, more or less undisputed edrioasteroid. The pentamerous Arkarua is older, dating from the late Precambrian, but with existing fossils of this organism showing no evidence of having stereoms, its status as an edrioasteroid echinoderm remains under much discussion.

There are two species of Walcottidiscus recognized, each known from a single, poorly preserved fossil specimen. W. typicallis is known from the smaller specimen, and W. magister is known from the larger specimen. Many experts suggest that W. magister actually represents a large specimen of W. typicallis, but more, better preserved specimens are needed to verify this hypothesis.
