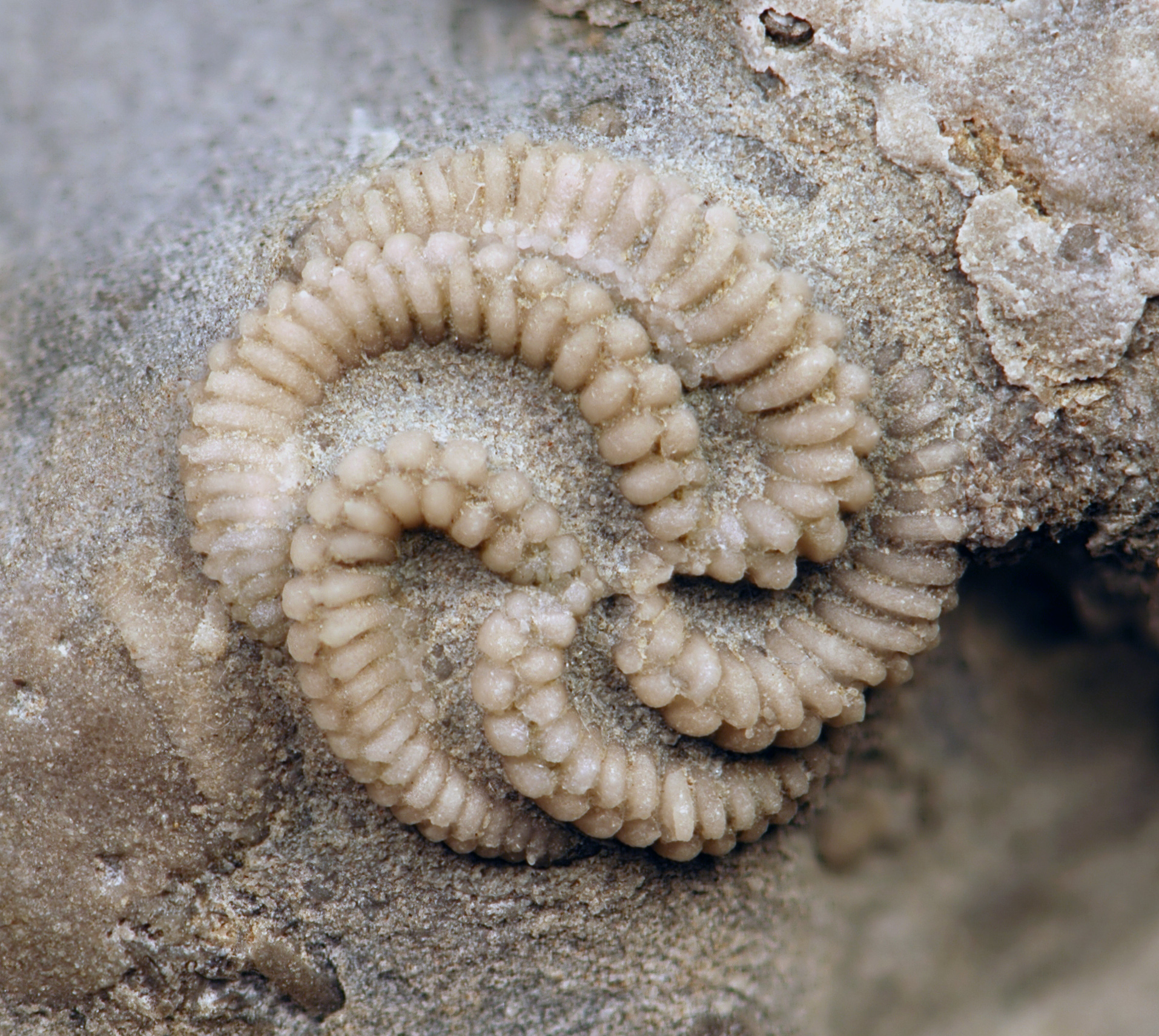
- Streptaster vorticellatus (13 mm across) from the Upper Ordovician of Kentucky, USA

Scientific classification
- Kingdom: Animalia
- Phylum: Echinodermata
- Class: †Edrioasteroidea; Billings 1858

Orders
- Edrioasterida; Isorophida

= Edrioasteroidea =

Edrioasteroidea Temporal range: Middle Cambrian–Early Permian Possible Ediacaran occurrence

Extinct class of marine invertebrates

Edrioasteroidea is an extinct class of echinoderms. The living animal would have resembled a pentamerously symmetrical disc or cushion. They were obligate encrusters and attached themselves to inorganic or biologic hard substrates (frequently hardgrounds or brachiopods). A 507 million years old species, Totiglobus spencensis, is actually the first known echinoderm adapted to live on a hard surface after the soft microbial mats that covered the seafloor were destroyed in the Cambrian substrate revolution.

The oldest undisputed fossils of Edrioasteroidea are known from Cambrian (Stage 3, about 515-520 Ma ago) of Laurentia and are among the oldest known fossils of echinoderms. Some authors propose that an enigmatic Ediacaran (about 600 Ma) organism Arkarua is also an edrioasteroid, but this interpretation did not gain wide acceptance. Last edrioasteroids are known from Permian (Late Kungurian, about 270-280 Ma).

== Anatomy ==
The body plan for this class was simple: a main body (theca), composed of many small plates, with a peripheral rim for attachment, and (in some species) a pedunculate zone for extension and retraction. Circling and sometimes attached to the body was a peripheral rim of plates. The main feature consisted of five arms, or ambulacra, in the body wall radiating outwards from the central mouth. The ambulacra grew either curved or straight. When curved, they may all turn in the same direction or else one or two on the right side will curve opposite the others. The ambulacra are built of underlying floor plates that form the food groove and protective cover plates that roof the food groove. The anus was under the mouth region and was made of small triangular plates to form a cone-shaped area. The bottom surface of the theca is unplated.

Edrioasteroid species are distinguished by differences in the ambulacral curvature, the relationships of the cover plates, and ornamentation. The mode of life was sessile; they were often attached via a stalk made of small plates to a hard object such as a carbonate hardground or shell. Several examples of epibiotic attachment have also been noted.

In the discocystinids, the area between the body and peripheral rim could be extended and retracted; in so doing the two were separated. The peripheral rim became the base of the stalk which was attached to a surface. Underneath the body was a recumbent zone, which was about 12 millimetres (0.47 in) wide in the genus Giganticlavus, followed by the pedunculate zone attached to the peripheral rim of 12 millimetres (0.47 in).

== List of genera ==
A very incomplete list of some genera.

- Walcottidiscus (oldest undisputed edrioasteroid, from the Middle Cambrian Burgess Shale community)
  - W. typicallis
  - W. magister
- Stromatocystites
  - S. pentangularis
  - S. reduncus
  - S. walcotti
- Kailidiscus
  - K. chinensis
- Edrioaster (type genus)
  - E. bigsbyi
  - E. priscus
- Edriophus
  - E. levis
- Paredriophus
  - P. elongatus
- Totiglobus
  - T. nimius
  - T. lloydi
- Cambraster
  - C. cannati
  - C. tastudorum
- Edriodiscus
  - E. primotica
- Lebedodiscus
- Foerstediscus
  - F. grandi
  - F. splendens
- Cystaster
  - C. stellatus
- Cryptogoleus
  - C. chapmani
- Bellochthus
- Streptaster
  - S. vorticellatus
- Cryptogoleus
  - C. chapmani
- Carneyella
  - C. pilea
  - C. faberi
  - C. ulrichi
- Isorophus
  - I. cincinnatiensis
- Isorophusella
- Camptostroma
- **C. roddyi
- Rectitriordo
- Agelacrinites
- Krama
  - K. devonicum (Bassler), 1936
- Parakrama
- Hemicystites
  - H. bohemica
  - H. chapmani
  - H. devonicus
- Neoisorophusella
  - N. lanei
  - N. berryi
  - N. maslennikovi
  - N. whitesidei
- Curvitriordo
- Thresherodiscus
  - T. ramosa (Foerste, 1914)
- Postibulla
  - P. westergaardi
- Parapostibulla
  - P. belli
  - P. graysoni
- Eopostibulla
- Pyrgopostibulla
- Yorkicystis
- Torquerisediscus
- Cooperidiscus
- Dynocystis
- Stalticodiscus
- Ulrichidiscus
- Clavidiscus
- Discocystis
- Hypsiclavus
- Spiraclavus
- Giganticlavus
- Lispidecodus
  - L. plinthotus (Kesling, 1967)

== Gallery ==
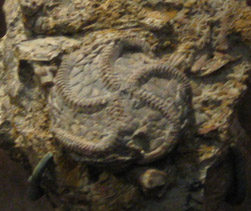
Foerstediscus splendens

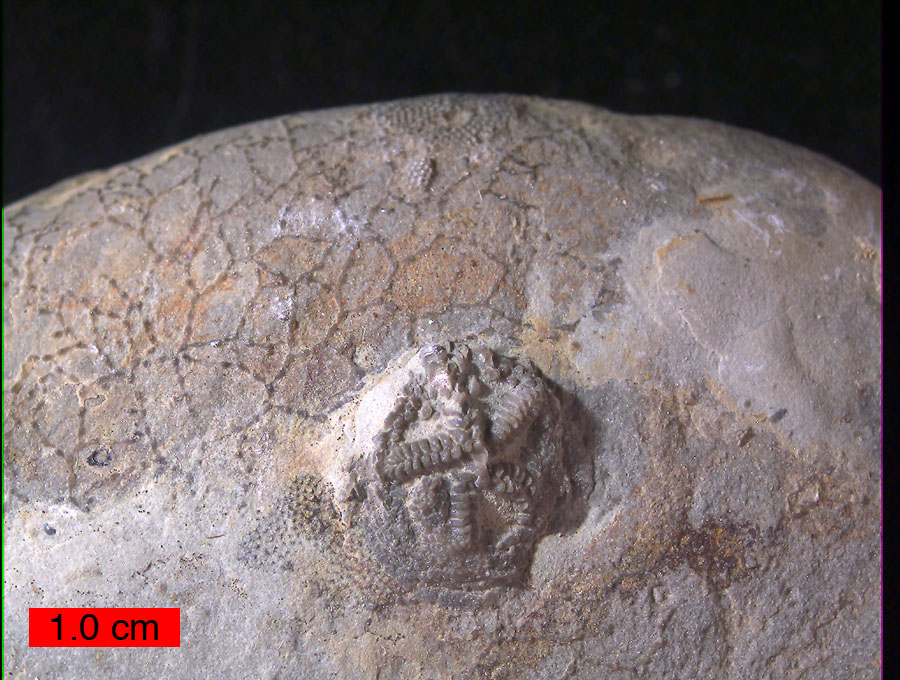
The Upper Ordovician edrioasteroid Cystaster stellatus on a cobble from the Kope Formation in northern Kentucky. In the background is the cyclostome bryozoan

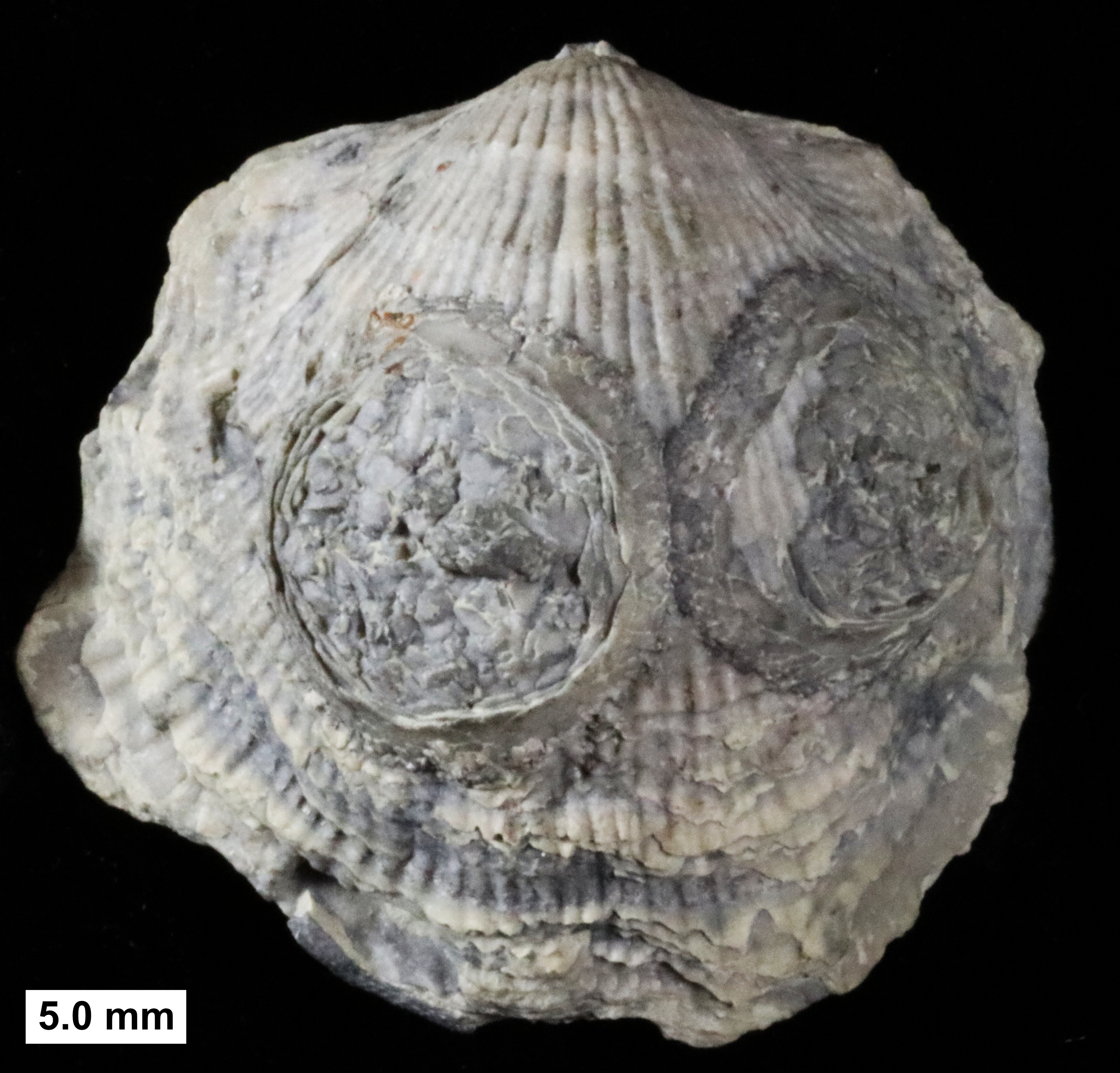
Two edrioasteroids, possibly Krama or Agelacrinites, with dissociated ambulacral plates, from the Devonian of Wisconsin.

== Taxonomy ==
- Mikko's taxonomy
