= Jean Baptiste François René Koehler =

French zoologist

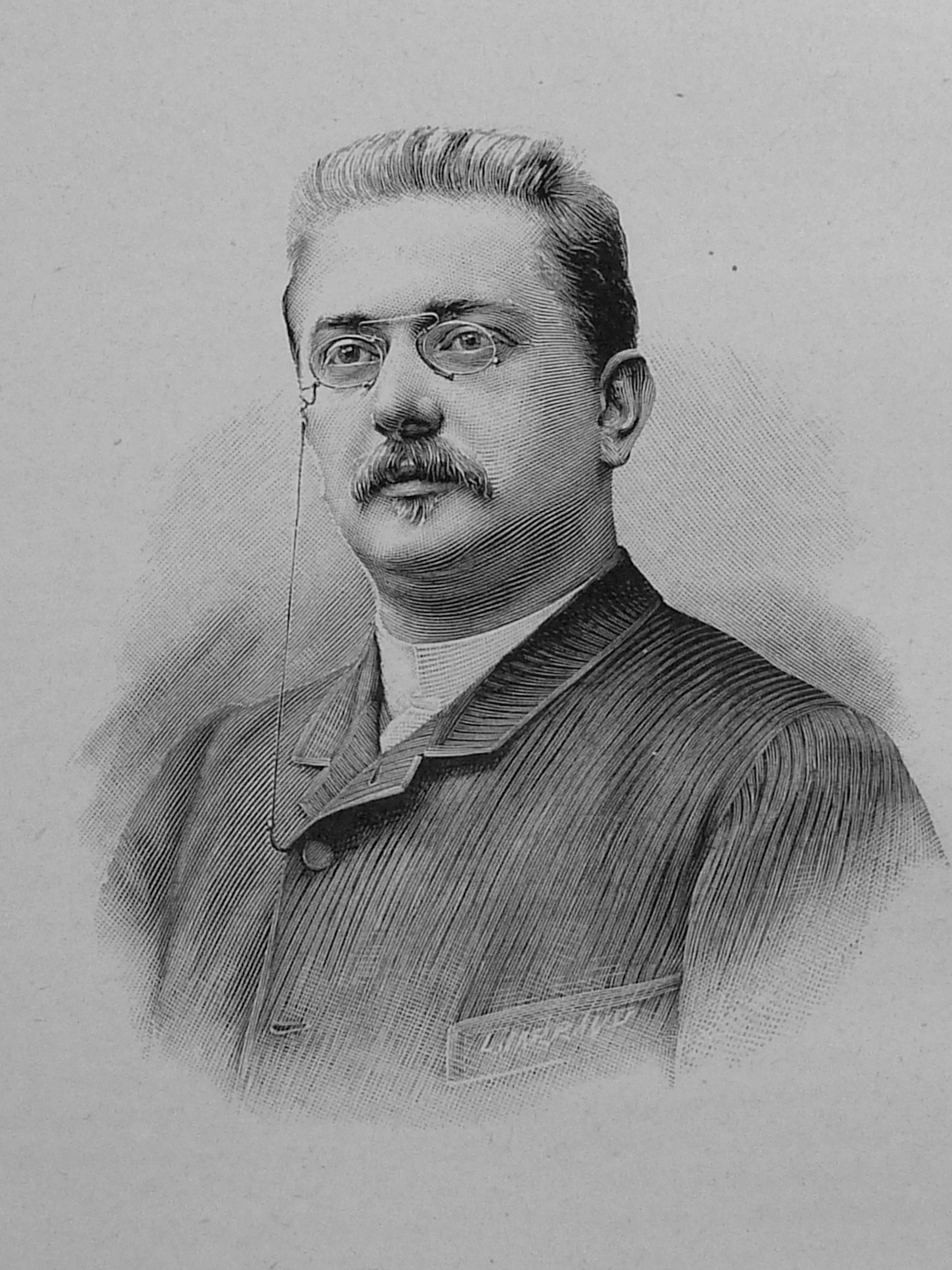
- Jean Baptiste François René Koehler (1908).
- Born: 7 March 1860; Saint-Dié, France
- Died: 19 April 1931 (aged 71); Lyon, France
- Known for: Echinoderms, Zoology
- Awards: President, Société zoologique de France (1911)
- Scientific career
- Fields: Zoology
- Workplaces: University of Lyon

Jean Baptiste François René Koehler (7 March 1860, Saint-Dié – 19 April 1931, Lyon) was a French zoologist best known for his research of echinoderms.

He studied medicine and zoology in Nancy. In 1889 he became a member of the faculty of sciences in Lyon, where in 1894, he attained the chair of zoology. In 1911 he was selected as president of the Société zoologique de France.

In 1988 the genus Koehleria (Cherbonnier) of the family Cucumariidae was named in his honor. Also, he is commemorated by organisms with the specific epithet of koehleri.

== Written works ==
He made contributions to the section on echinoderms in the series Faune de France. His other publications include:

- Recherches sur la faune marine des iles Anglo-Normandes, 1885 – Research on marine fauna of the Channel Islands.
- Résultats scientifiques de la campagne du "Caudan" dans le golfe de Gascogne : août-septembre 1895, (1896) – Scientific results of the "Caudan campaign" in the Gulf of Gascony.
- Expédition antarctique belge : résultats du voyage du S.Y. Belgica en 1897–1898–1899 sous le commandement de A. de Gerlache de Gomery, 1902 – Belgian Antarctic Expedition, results from the voyage of the S.Y. Belgica 1897–1899.
- Ophiures de l'expédition du Siboga / Ie pt., Ophiures de mer profonde, 1904 – Ophiurans from the Siboga Expedition, part 1; ophiurans from the deep sea.
- Ophiures de l'expédition du Siboga / IIe pt., Ophiures littorales, 1905 – Orphirians from the Siboga Expedition, part II; ophiurans from the littoral regions.
- Expéditions scientifiques du Travailleur et du Talisman pendant les années 1880, 1881, 1882, 1883, (1906) – Scientific expeditions of the Travailleur and Talisman during the years 1880 to 1883.
- Echinodermes provenant des campagnes du yacht Princesse-Alice : astéries, ophiures, échinides et crinoïdes, 1909 – Echinoderms collected from campaigns of the yacht Princesse-Alice.
- "Ophiurans of the Philippine seas and adjacent waters", Washington, G.P.O., 1922, (manuscript translated by Austin H. Clark).
- Les échinodermes des mers d'Europe, 1924 – Echinoderms from the seas of Europe.
